

12001–12100 

|-bgcolor=#d6d6d6
| 12001 Gasbarini ||  ||  || March 12, 1996 || Kitt Peak || Spacewatch || — || align=right | 12 km || 
|-id=002 bgcolor=#d6d6d6
| 12002 Suess ||  ||  || March 19, 1996 || Ondřejov || P. Pravec, L. Kotková || EOS || align=right | 6.3 km || 
|-id=003 bgcolor=#d6d6d6
| 12003 Hideosugai ||  ||  || March 20, 1996 || Nanyo || T. Okuni || 7:4 || align=right | 23 km || 
|-id=004 bgcolor=#d6d6d6
| 12004 ||  || — || May 15, 1996 || Haleakalā || NEAT || — || align=right | 11 km || 
|-id=005 bgcolor=#d6d6d6
| 12005 Delgiudice ||  ||  || May 19, 1996 || Socorro || R. Weber || — || align=right | 19 km || 
|-id=006 bgcolor=#d6d6d6
| 12006 Hruschka || 1996 OO ||  || July 20, 1996 || Ondřejov || L. Kotková || 3:2 || align=right | 19 km || 
|-id=007 bgcolor=#fefefe
| 12007 Fermat ||  ||  || October 11, 1996 || Prescott || P. G. Comba || FLO || align=right | 2.2 km || 
|-id=008 bgcolor=#FA8072
| 12008 Kandrup ||  ||  || October 11, 1996 || Catalina || T. B. Spahr || moon || align=right | 7.0 km || 
|-id=009 bgcolor=#FA8072
| 12009 || 1996 UE || — || October 16, 1996 || Ōizumi || T. Kobayashi || — || align=right | 2.8 km || 
|-id=010 bgcolor=#fefefe
| 12010 Kovářov || 1996 UN ||  || October 18, 1996 || Kleť || J. Tichá, M. Tichý || — || align=right | 2.7 km || 
|-id=011 bgcolor=#fefefe
| 12011 ||  || — || November 14, 1996 || Ōizumi || T. Kobayashi || V || align=right | 3.0 km || 
|-id=012 bgcolor=#fefefe
| 12012 Kitahiroshima ||  ||  || November 7, 1996 || Kitami || K. Endate, K. Watanabe || — || align=right | 3.5 km || 
|-id=013 bgcolor=#fefefe
| 12013 Sibatahosimi ||  ||  || November 7, 1996 || Kitami || K. Endate, K. Watanabe || FLO || align=right | 2.4 km || 
|-id=014 bgcolor=#fefefe
| 12014 Bobhawkes ||  ||  || November 5, 1996 || Kitt Peak || Spacewatch || NYS || align=right | 4.7 km || 
|-id=015 bgcolor=#fefefe
| 12015 || 1996 WA || — || November 16, 1996 || Ōizumi || T. Kobayashi || — || align=right | 2.9 km || 
|-id=016 bgcolor=#fefefe
| 12016 Green || 1996 XC ||  || December 1, 1996 || Prescott || P. G. Comba || — || align=right | 8.0 km || 
|-id=017 bgcolor=#fefefe
| 12017 ||  || — || December 2, 1996 || Ōizumi || T. Kobayashi || — || align=right | 3.4 km || 
|-id=018 bgcolor=#fefefe
| 12018 ||  || — || December 10, 1996 || Xinglong || SCAP || — || align=right | 3.3 km || 
|-id=019 bgcolor=#fefefe
| 12019 ||  || — || December 8, 1996 || Ōizumi || T. Kobayashi || FLO || align=right | 2.6 km || 
|-id=020 bgcolor=#fefefe
| 12020 ||  || — || December 11, 1996 || Ōizumi || T. Kobayashi || — || align=right | 6.1 km || 
|-id=021 bgcolor=#fefefe
| 12021 ||  || — || December 12, 1996 || Ōizumi || T. Kobayashi || FLO || align=right | 2.7 km || 
|-id=022 bgcolor=#fefefe
| 12022 Hilbert ||  ||  || December 15, 1996 || Prescott || P. G. Comba || — || align=right | 3.0 km || 
|-id=023 bgcolor=#fefefe
| 12023 || 1996 YJ || — || December 20, 1996 || Ōizumi || T. Kobayashi || V || align=right | 2.5 km || 
|-id=024 bgcolor=#fefefe
| 12024 ||  || — || December 28, 1996 || Ōizumi || T. Kobayashi || — || align=right | 2.7 km || 
|-id=025 bgcolor=#fefefe
| 12025 ||  || — || January 2, 1997 || Ōizumi || T. Kobayashi || — || align=right | 4.5 km || 
|-id=026 bgcolor=#fefefe
| 12026 ||  || — || January 3, 1997 || Ōizumi || T. Kobayashi || — || align=right | 5.0 km || 
|-id=027 bgcolor=#fefefe
| 12027 Masaakitanaka ||  ||  || January 3, 1997 || Chichibu || N. Satō || — || align=right | 3.4 km || 
|-id=028 bgcolor=#E9E9E9
| 12028 Annekinney ||  ||  || January 9, 1997 || Ōizumi || T. Kobayashi || EUN || align=right | 4.2 km || 
|-id=029 bgcolor=#E9E9E9
| 12029 ||  || — || January 11, 1997 || Xinglong || SCAP || DOR || align=right | 12 km || 
|-id=030 bgcolor=#fefefe
| 12030 ||  || — || January 30, 1997 || Ōizumi || T. Kobayashi || — || align=right | 2.9 km || 
|-id=031 bgcolor=#fefefe
| 12031 Kobaton ||  ||  || January 30, 1997 || Chichibu || N. Satō || — || align=right | 4.6 km || 
|-id=032 bgcolor=#fefefe
| 12032 Ivory ||  ||  || January 31, 1997 || Prescott || P. G. Comba || NYS || align=right | 1.9 km || 
|-id=033 bgcolor=#d6d6d6
| 12033 Anselmo ||  ||  || January 31, 1997 || Cima Ekar || M. Tombelli, U. Munari || THM || align=right | 10 km || 
|-id=034 bgcolor=#E9E9E9
| 12034 || 1997 CR || — || February 1, 1997 || Ōizumi || T. Kobayashi || — || align=right | 5.9 km || 
|-id=035 bgcolor=#fefefe
| 12035 Ruggieri ||  ||  || February 1, 1997 || Pianoro || V. Goretti || — || align=right | 5.7 km || 
|-id=036 bgcolor=#E9E9E9
| 12036 ||  || — || February 11, 1997 || Ōizumi || T. Kobayashi || — || align=right | 5.6 km || 
|-id=037 bgcolor=#fefefe
| 12037 ||  || — || February 11, 1997 || Chiyoda || T. Kojima || NYS || align=right | 2.1 km || 
|-id=038 bgcolor=#E9E9E9
| 12038 ||  || — || February 12, 1997 || Ōizumi || T. Kobayashi || — || align=right | 4.8 km || 
|-id=039 bgcolor=#E9E9E9
| 12039 ||  || — || February 13, 1997 || Ōizumi || T. Kobayashi || — || align=right | 16 km || 
|-id=040 bgcolor=#fefefe
| 12040 Jacobi ||  ||  || March 8, 1997 || Prescott || P. G. Comba || — || align=right | 2.6 km || 
|-id=041 bgcolor=#d6d6d6
| 12041 ||  || — || March 5, 1997 || Oohira || T. Urata || 7:4 || align=right | 9.5 km || 
|-id=042 bgcolor=#d6d6d6
| 12042 Laques || 1997 FC ||  || March 17, 1997 || Ramonville || C. Buil || EOS || align=right | 10 km || 
|-id=043 bgcolor=#d6d6d6
| 12043 || 1997 FN || — || March 22, 1997 || Xinglong || SCAP || — || align=right | 14 km || 
|-id=044 bgcolor=#E9E9E9
| 12044 Fabbri || 1997 FU ||  || March 29, 1997 || Montelupo || M. Tombelli, G. Forti || — || align=right | 7.3 km || 
|-id=045 bgcolor=#E9E9E9
| 12045 Klein ||  ||  || March 30, 1997 || Prescott || P. G. Comba || — || align=right | 10 km || 
|-id=046 bgcolor=#d6d6d6
| 12046 ||  || — || March 31, 1997 || Socorro || LINEAR || HYG || align=right | 14 km || 
|-id=047 bgcolor=#d6d6d6
| 12047 Hideomitani ||  ||  || April 3, 1997 || Kitami || K. Endate, K. Watanabe || — || align=right | 10 km || 
|-id=048 bgcolor=#d6d6d6
| 12048 ||  || — || April 2, 1997 || Xinglong || SCAP || EOS || align=right | 6.7 km || 
|-id=049 bgcolor=#d6d6d6
| 12049 ||  || — || April 3, 1997 || Socorro || LINEAR || KOR || align=right | 6.7 km || 
|-id=050 bgcolor=#d6d6d6
| 12050 Humecronyn ||  ||  || April 27, 1997 || Kitt Peak || Spacewatch || KOR || align=right | 6.9 km || 
|-id=051 bgcolor=#fefefe
| 12051 Pícha || 1997 JO ||  || May 2, 1997 || Ondřejov || L. Kotková || KLI || align=right | 6.8 km || 
|-id=052 bgcolor=#C2FFFF
| 12052 Aretaon ||  ||  || May 3, 1997 || La Silla || E. W. Elst || L5 || align=right | 39 km || 
|-id=053 bgcolor=#fefefe
| 12053 Turtlestar ||  ||  || August 9, 1997 || Starkenburg Observatory || Starkenburg Obs. || V || align=right | 3.5 km || 
|-id=054 bgcolor=#C2FFFF
| 12054 ||  || — || October 5, 1997 || Ondřejov || L. Kotková || L4 || align=right | 23 km || 
|-id=055 bgcolor=#fefefe
| 12055 ||  || — || December 30, 1997 || Ōizumi || T. Kobayashi || — || align=right | 3.6 km || 
|-id=056 bgcolor=#fefefe
| 12056 Yoshigeru ||  ||  || December 30, 1997 || Ōizumi || T. Kobayashi || FLO || align=right | 3.2 km || 
|-id=057 bgcolor=#fefefe
| 12057 Alfredsturm ||  ||  || February 18, 1998 || Starkenburg Observatory || Starkenburg Obs. || — || align=right | 3.2 km || 
|-id=058 bgcolor=#E9E9E9
| 12058 ||  || — || February 24, 1998 || Haleakalā || NEAT || — || align=right | 4.4 km || 
|-id=059 bgcolor=#E9E9E9
| 12059 du Châtelet ||  ||  || March 1, 1998 || La Silla || E. W. Elst || — || align=right | 4.8 km || 
|-id=060 bgcolor=#fefefe
| 12060 ||  || — || March 20, 1998 || Socorro || LINEAR || PHO || align=right | 3.5 km || 
|-id=061 bgcolor=#fefefe
| 12061 Alena ||  ||  || March 21, 1998 || Zeno || T. Stafford || — || align=right | 4.4 km || 
|-id=062 bgcolor=#E9E9E9
| 12062 Tilmanspohn ||  ||  || March 24, 1998 || Caussols || ODAS || — || align=right | 3.8 km || 
|-id=063 bgcolor=#fefefe
| 12063 ||  || — || March 22, 1998 || Ōizumi || T. Kobayashi || — || align=right | 3.2 km || 
|-id=064 bgcolor=#E9E9E9
| 12064 Guiraudon ||  ||  || March 28, 1998 || Caussols || ODAS || HNS || align=right | 6.6 km || 
|-id=065 bgcolor=#fefefe
| 12065 Jaworski ||  ||  || March 20, 1998 || Socorro || LINEAR || NYS || align=right | 2.0 km || 
|-id=066 bgcolor=#E9E9E9
| 12066 ||  || — || March 20, 1998 || Socorro || LINEAR || — || align=right | 3.3 km || 
|-id=067 bgcolor=#fefefe
| 12067 Jeter ||  ||  || March 20, 1998 || Socorro || LINEAR || — || align=right | 2.4 km || 
|-id=068 bgcolor=#fefefe
| 12068 Khandrika ||  ||  || March 20, 1998 || Socorro || LINEAR || FLO || align=right | 3.1 km || 
|-id=069 bgcolor=#fefefe
| 12069 ||  || — || March 20, 1998 || Socorro || LINEAR || — || align=right | 5.4 km || 
|-id=070 bgcolor=#fefefe
| 12070 Kilkis ||  ||  || March 20, 1998 || Socorro || LINEAR || NYS || align=right | 3.3 km || 
|-id=071 bgcolor=#fefefe
| 12071 Davykim ||  ||  || March 20, 1998 || Socorro || LINEAR || FLO || align=right | 4.1 km || 
|-id=072 bgcolor=#fefefe
| 12072 Anupamakotha ||  ||  || March 20, 1998 || Socorro || LINEAR || SUL || align=right | 7.3 km || 
|-id=073 bgcolor=#fefefe
| 12073 Larimer ||  ||  || March 20, 1998 || Socorro || LINEAR || — || align=right | 3.0 km || 
|-id=074 bgcolor=#E9E9E9
| 12074 Carolinelau ||  ||  || March 20, 1998 || Socorro || LINEAR || — || align=right | 3.8 km || 
|-id=075 bgcolor=#fefefe
| 12075 Legg ||  ||  || March 20, 1998 || Socorro || LINEAR || NYS || align=right | 6.9 km || 
|-id=076 bgcolor=#E9E9E9
| 12076 ||  || — || March 20, 1998 || Socorro || LINEAR || — || align=right | 5.4 km || 
|-id=077 bgcolor=#E9E9E9
| 12077 ||  || — || March 20, 1998 || Socorro || LINEAR || — || align=right | 5.6 km || 
|-id=078 bgcolor=#fefefe
| 12078 ||  || — || March 20, 1998 || Socorro || LINEAR || — || align=right | 2.5 km || 
|-id=079 bgcolor=#fefefe
| 12079 Kaibab ||  ||  || March 22, 1998 || Anderson Mesa || LONEOS || NYS || align=right | 3.9 km || 
|-id=080 bgcolor=#d6d6d6
| 12080 ||  || — || March 31, 1998 || Socorro || LINEAR || EOS || align=right | 10 km || 
|-id=081 bgcolor=#fefefe
| 12081 ||  || — || March 31, 1998 || Socorro || LINEAR || — || align=right | 4.6 km || 
|-id=082 bgcolor=#E9E9E9
| 12082 ||  || — || March 31, 1998 || Socorro || LINEAR || — || align=right | 8.8 km || 
|-id=083 bgcolor=#fefefe
| 12083 ||  || — || March 20, 1998 || Socorro || LINEAR || — || align=right | 3.7 km || 
|-id=084 bgcolor=#E9E9E9
| 12084 Unno ||  ||  || March 22, 1998 || Geisei || T. Seki || — || align=right | 5.5 km || 
|-id=085 bgcolor=#fefefe
| 12085 ||  || — || April 18, 1998 || Socorro || LINEAR || — || align=right | 2.5 km || 
|-id=086 bgcolor=#fefefe
| 12086 Joshualevine ||  ||  || April 20, 1998 || Socorro || LINEAR || — || align=right | 2.1 km || 
|-id=087 bgcolor=#fefefe
| 12087 Tiffanylin ||  ||  || April 20, 1998 || Socorro || LINEAR || — || align=right | 2.4 km || 
|-id=088 bgcolor=#fefefe
| 12088 Macalintal ||  ||  || April 20, 1998 || Socorro || LINEAR || V || align=right | 3.7 km || 
|-id=089 bgcolor=#fefefe
| 12089 Maichin ||  ||  || April 20, 1998 || Socorro || LINEAR || — || align=right | 5.6 km || 
|-id=090 bgcolor=#E9E9E9
| 12090 ||  || — || April 20, 1998 || Socorro || LINEAR || DOR || align=right | 9.2 km || 
|-id=091 bgcolor=#fefefe
| 12091 Jesmalmquist ||  ||  || April 21, 1998 || Socorro || LINEAR || V || align=right | 3.4 km || 
|-id=092 bgcolor=#E9E9E9
| 12092 ||  || — || April 21, 1998 || Socorro || LINEAR || KON || align=right | 9.7 km || 
|-id=093 bgcolor=#fefefe
| 12093 Chrimatthews ||  ||  || April 21, 1998 || Socorro || LINEAR || — || align=right | 2.3 km || 
|-id=094 bgcolor=#fefefe
| 12094 Mazumder ||  ||  || April 21, 1998 || Socorro || LINEAR || — || align=right | 3.4 km || 
|-id=095 bgcolor=#d6d6d6
| 12095 Pinel ||  ||  || April 25, 1998 || La Silla || E. W. Elst || KOR || align=right | 6.4 km || 
|-id=096 bgcolor=#E9E9E9
| 12096 ||  || — || April 23, 1998 || Socorro || LINEAR || — || align=right | 6.6 km || 
|-id=097 bgcolor=#fefefe
| 12097 ||  || — || April 23, 1998 || Socorro || LINEAR || — || align=right | 4.1 km || 
|-id=098 bgcolor=#d6d6d6
| 12098 ||  || — || April 23, 1998 || Socorro || LINEAR || — || align=right | 16 km || 
|-id=099 bgcolor=#fefefe
| 12099 Meigooni ||  ||  || April 23, 1998 || Socorro || LINEAR || — || align=right | 3.6 km || 
|-id=100 bgcolor=#E9E9E9
| 12100 Amiens ||  ||  || April 25, 1998 || La Silla || E. W. Elst || — || align=right | 2.6 km || 
|}

12101–12200 

|-bgcolor=#d6d6d6
| 12101 Trujillo ||  ||  || May 1, 1998 || Anderson Mesa || LONEOS || EOS || align=right | 7.0 km || 
|-id=102 bgcolor=#E9E9E9
| 12102 Piazzolla ||  ||  || May 5, 1998 || Woomera || F. B. Zoltowski || EUN || align=right | 4.9 km || 
|-id=103 bgcolor=#fefefe
| 12103 || 1998 KL || — || May 19, 1998 || Woomera || F. B. Zoltowski || — || align=right | 3.2 km || 
|-id=104 bgcolor=#d6d6d6
| 12104 Chesley ||  ||  || May 22, 1998 || Anderson Mesa || LONEOS || — || align=right | 11 km || 
|-id=105 bgcolor=#fefefe
| 12105 ||  || — || May 25, 1998 || Xinglong || SCAP || FLO || align=right | 3.6 km || 
|-id=106 bgcolor=#fefefe
| 12106 Menghuan ||  ||  || May 22, 1998 || Socorro || LINEAR || V || align=right | 2.0 km || 
|-id=107 bgcolor=#fefefe
| 12107 ||  || — || May 22, 1998 || Socorro || LINEAR || — || align=right | 3.1 km || 
|-id=108 bgcolor=#d6d6d6
| 12108 ||  || — || May 22, 1998 || Socorro || LINEAR || HYG || align=right | 9.7 km || 
|-id=109 bgcolor=#E9E9E9
| 12109 ||  || — || May 23, 1998 || Socorro || LINEAR || — || align=right | 10 km || 
|-id=110 bgcolor=#fefefe
| 12110 ||  || — || May 22, 1998 || La Palma || M. R. Burleigh, N. P. Bannister || — || align=right | 4.0 km || 
|-id=111 bgcolor=#E9E9E9
| 12111 Ulm || 1998 LU ||  || June 1, 1998 || La Silla || E. W. Elst || — || align=right | 4.2 km || 
|-id=112 bgcolor=#d6d6d6
| 12112 Sprague ||  ||  || June 23, 1998 || Catalina || CSS || ALA || align=right | 14 km || 
|-id=113 bgcolor=#d6d6d6
| 12113 Hollows ||  ||  || July 29, 1998 || Reedy Creek || J. Broughton || EOS || align=right | 10 km || 
|-id=114 bgcolor=#d6d6d6
| 12114 ||  || — || August 17, 1998 || Socorro || LINEAR || — || align=right | 16 km || 
|-id=115 bgcolor=#d6d6d6
| 12115 Robertgrimm ||  ||  || September 16, 1998 || Catalina || CSS || — || align=right | 20 km || 
|-id=116 bgcolor=#d6d6d6
| 12116 ||  || — || May 10, 1999 || Socorro || LINEAR || — || align=right | 13 km || 
|-id=117 bgcolor=#fefefe
| 12117 Meagmessina ||  ||  || May 10, 1999 || Socorro || LINEAR || — || align=right | 3.1 km || 
|-id=118 bgcolor=#fefefe
| 12118 Mirotsin ||  ||  || July 13, 1999 || Socorro || LINEAR || FLO || align=right | 4.2 km || 
|-id=119 bgcolor=#fefefe
| 12119 Memamis ||  ||  || July 13, 1999 || Socorro || LINEAR || — || align=right | 3.4 km || 
|-id=120 bgcolor=#fefefe
| 12120 ||  || — || July 14, 1999 || Socorro || LINEAR || — || align=right | 2.8 km || 
|-id=121 bgcolor=#E9E9E9
| 12121 ||  || — || July 13, 1999 || Socorro || LINEAR || EUN || align=right | 4.7 km || 
|-id=122 bgcolor=#d6d6d6
| 12122 ||  || — || July 12, 1999 || Socorro || LINEAR || — || align=right | 7.3 km || 
|-id=123 bgcolor=#fefefe
| 12123 Pazin || 1999 OS ||  || July 18, 1999 || Višnjan Observatory || Višnjan Obs. || NYS || align=right | 5.7 km || 
|-id=124 bgcolor=#d6d6d6
| 12124 Hvar ||  ||  || September 6, 1999 || Višnjan Observatory || K. Korlević || KOR || align=right | 5.6 km || 
|-id=125 bgcolor=#d6d6d6
| 12125 Jamesjones ||  ||  || September 3, 1999 || Kitt Peak || Spacewatch || — || align=right | 11 km || 
|-id=126 bgcolor=#C2FFFF
| 12126 ||  || — || September 7, 1999 || Socorro || LINEAR || L5 || align=right | 53 km || 
|-id=127 bgcolor=#fefefe
| 12127 Mamiya ||  ||  || September 9, 1999 || JCPM Sapporo || K. Watanabe || NYS || align=right | 11 km || 
|-id=128 bgcolor=#d6d6d6
| 12128 Palermiti ||  ||  || September 13, 1999 || Fountain Hills || C. W. Juels || EOS || align=right | 8.9 km || 
|-id=129 bgcolor=#d6d6d6
| 12129 ||  || — || September 9, 1999 || Socorro || LINEAR || THM || align=right | 14 km || 
|-id=130 bgcolor=#E9E9E9
| 12130 Mousa ||  ||  || September 9, 1999 || Socorro || LINEAR || — || align=right | 3.4 km || 
|-id=131 bgcolor=#d6d6d6
| 12131 Echternach || 2085 P-L ||  || September 24, 1960 || Palomar || PLS || KOR || align=right | 4.4 km || 
|-id=132 bgcolor=#E9E9E9
| 12132 Wimfröger || 2103 P-L ||  || September 24, 1960 || Palomar || PLS || VIB || align=right | 8.1 km || 
|-id=133 bgcolor=#d6d6d6
| 12133 Titulaer || 2558 P-L ||  || September 24, 1960 || Palomar || PLS || HYG || align=right | 9.7 km || 
|-id=134 bgcolor=#d6d6d6
| 12134 Hansfriedeman || 2574 P-L ||  || September 24, 1960 || Palomar || PLS || ALA || align=right | 8.6 km || 
|-id=135 bgcolor=#d6d6d6
| 12135 Terlingen || 3021 P-L ||  || September 24, 1960 || Palomar || PLS || — || align=right | 13 km || 
|-id=136 bgcolor=#E9E9E9
| 12136 Martinryle || 3045 P-L ||  || September 24, 1960 || Palomar || PLS || EUN || align=right | 5.6 km || 
|-id=137 bgcolor=#E9E9E9
| 12137 Williefowler || 4004 P-L ||  || September 24, 1960 || Palomar || PLS || — || align=right | 5.6 km || 
|-id=138 bgcolor=#fefefe
| 12138 Olinwilson || 4053 P-L ||  || September 24, 1960 || Palomar || PLS || — || align=right | 3.2 km || 
|-id=139 bgcolor=#fefefe
| 12139 Tomcowling || 4055 P-L ||  || September 24, 1960 || Palomar || PLS || — || align=right | 9.1 km || 
|-id=140 bgcolor=#fefefe
| 12140 Johnbolton || 4087 P-L ||  || September 24, 1960 || Palomar || PLS || — || align=right | 6.1 km || 
|-id=141 bgcolor=#E9E9E9
| 12141 Chushayashi || 4112 P-L ||  || September 24, 1960 || Palomar || PLS || HEN || align=right | 4.8 km || 
|-id=142 bgcolor=#d6d6d6
| 12142 Franklow || 4624 P-L ||  || September 24, 1960 || Palomar || PLS || — || align=right | 8.8 km || 
|-id=143 bgcolor=#fefefe
| 12143 Harwit || 4631 P-L ||  || September 24, 1960 || Palomar || PLS || V || align=right | 3.0 km || 
|-id=144 bgcolor=#d6d6d6
| 12144 Einhart || 4661 P-L ||  || September 24, 1960 || Palomar || PLS || KOR || align=right | 4.5 km || 
|-id=145 bgcolor=#E9E9E9
| 12145 Behaim || 4730 P-L ||  || September 24, 1960 || Palomar || PLS || — || align=right | 3.5 km || 
|-id=146 bgcolor=#E9E9E9
| 12146 Ostriker || 6035 P-L ||  || September 24, 1960 || Palomar || PLS || ADE || align=right | 8.8 km || 
|-id=147 bgcolor=#fefefe
| 12147 Bramante || 6082 P-L ||  || September 24, 1960 || Palomar || PLS || — || align=right | 4.7 km || 
|-id=148 bgcolor=#d6d6d6
| 12148 Caravaggio || 6636 P-L ||  || September 24, 1960 || Palomar || PLS || — || align=right | 8.4 km || 
|-id=149 bgcolor=#d6d6d6
| 12149 Begas || 9099 P-L ||  || October 17, 1960 || Palomar || PLS || — || align=right | 5.6 km || 
|-id=150 bgcolor=#d6d6d6
| 12150 De Ruyter || 1051 T-1 ||  || March 25, 1971 || Palomar || PLS || EOS || align=right | 11 km || 
|-id=151 bgcolor=#fefefe
| 12151 Oranje-Nassau || 1220 T-1 ||  || March 25, 1971 || Palomar || PLS || NYS || align=right | 3.0 km || 
|-id=152 bgcolor=#fefefe
| 12152 Aratus || 1287 T-1 ||  || March 25, 1971 || Palomar || PLS || — || align=right | 2.3 km || 
|-id=153 bgcolor=#fefefe
| 12153 Conon || 3219 T-1 ||  || March 26, 1971 || Palomar || PLS || FLO || align=right | 1.9 km || 
|-id=154 bgcolor=#d6d6d6
| 12154 Callimachus || 3329 T-1 ||  || March 26, 1971 || Palomar || PLS || — || align=right | 6.0 km || 
|-id=155 bgcolor=#fefefe
| 12155 Hyginus || 4193 T-1 ||  || March 26, 1971 || Palomar || PLS || NYS || align=right | 4.4 km || 
|-id=156 bgcolor=#E9E9E9
| 12156 Ubels || 1042 T-2 ||  || September 29, 1973 || Palomar || PLS || — || align=right | 5.1 km || 
|-id=157 bgcolor=#fefefe
| 12157 Können || 1070 T-2 ||  || September 29, 1973 || Palomar || PLS || V || align=right | 2.6 km || 
|-id=158 bgcolor=#d6d6d6
| 12158 Tape || 1101 T-2 ||  || September 29, 1973 || Palomar || PLS || — || align=right | 11 km || 
|-id=159 bgcolor=#fefefe
| 12159 Bettybiegel || 1142 T-2 ||  || September 29, 1973 || Palomar || PLS || NYS || align=right | 2.9 km || 
|-id=160 bgcolor=#fefefe
| 12160 Karelwakker || 1152 T-2 ||  || September 29, 1973 || Palomar || PLS || — || align=right | 3.6 km || 
|-id=161 bgcolor=#fefefe
| 12161 Avienius || 1158 T-2 ||  || September 29, 1973 || Palomar || PLS || NYS || align=right | 1.7 km || 
|-id=162 bgcolor=#E9E9E9
| 12162 Bilderdijk || 2145 T-2 ||  || September 29, 1973 || Palomar || PLS || EUN || align=right | 4.0 km || 
|-id=163 bgcolor=#E9E9E9
| 12163 Manilius || 3013 T-2 ||  || September 30, 1973 || Palomar || PLS || — || align=right | 3.9 km || 
|-id=164 bgcolor=#fefefe
| 12164 Lowellgreen || 3067 T-2 ||  || September 30, 1973 || Palomar || PLS || — || align=right | 3.1 km || 
|-id=165 bgcolor=#d6d6d6
| 12165 Ringleb || 3289 T-2 ||  || September 30, 1973 || Palomar || PLS || EOS || align=right | 8.5 km || 
|-id=166 bgcolor=#E9E9E9
| 12166 Oliverherrmann || 3372 T-2 ||  || September 25, 1973 || Palomar || PLS || — || align=right | 4.1 km || 
|-id=167 bgcolor=#fefefe
| 12167 Olivermüller || 4306 T-2 ||  || September 29, 1973 || Palomar || PLS || — || align=right | 4.0 km || 
|-id=168 bgcolor=#d6d6d6
| 12168 Polko || 5141 T-2 ||  || September 25, 1973 || Palomar || PLS || EOS || align=right | 12 km || 
|-id=169 bgcolor=#fefefe
| 12169 Munsterman || 2031 T-3 ||  || October 16, 1977 || Palomar || PLS || — || align=right | 1.9 km || 
|-id=170 bgcolor=#d6d6d6
| 12170 Vanvollenhoven || 2372 T-3 ||  || October 16, 1977 || Palomar || PLS || — || align=right | 7.7 km || 
|-id=171 bgcolor=#E9E9E9
| 12171 Johannink || 2382 T-3 ||  || October 16, 1977 || Palomar || PLS || — || align=right | 5.6 km || 
|-id=172 bgcolor=#fefefe
| 12172 Niekdekort || 2390 T-3 ||  || October 16, 1977 || Palomar || PLS || — || align=right | 4.3 km || 
|-id=173 bgcolor=#E9E9E9
| 12173 Lansbergen || 3135 T-3 ||  || October 16, 1977 || Palomar || PLS || — || align=right | 4.2 km || 
|-id=174 bgcolor=#E9E9E9
| 12174 van het Reve || 3164 T-3 ||  || October 16, 1977 || Palomar || PLS || — || align=right | 5.4 km || 
|-id=175 bgcolor=#d6d6d6
| 12175 Wimhermans || 3197 T-3 ||  || October 16, 1977 || Palomar || PLS || THM || align=right | 12 km || 
|-id=176 bgcolor=#fefefe
| 12176 Hidayat || 3468 T-3 ||  || October 16, 1977 || Palomar || PLS || MAS || align=right | 2.4 km || 
|-id=177 bgcolor=#fefefe
| 12177 Raharto || 4074 T-3 ||  || October 16, 1977 || Palomar || PLS || — || align=right | 2.9 km || 
|-id=178 bgcolor=#E9E9E9
| 12178 Dhani || 4304 T-3 ||  || October 16, 1977 || Palomar || PLS || — || align=right | 6.3 km || 
|-id=179 bgcolor=#d6d6d6
| 12179 Taufiq || 5030 T-3 ||  || October 16, 1977 || Palomar || PLS || — || align=right | 5.3 km || 
|-id=180 bgcolor=#d6d6d6
| 12180 Kistemaker || 5167 T-3 ||  || October 16, 1977 || Palomar || PLS || — || align=right | 8.4 km || 
|-id=181 bgcolor=#E9E9E9
| 12181 ||  || — || November 9, 1964 || Nanking || Purple Mountain Obs. || — || align=right | 9.3 km || 
|-id=182 bgcolor=#fefefe
| 12182 Storm ||  ||  || October 27, 1973 || Tautenburg Observatory || F. Börngen || — || align=right | 4.5 km || 
|-id=183 bgcolor=#d6d6d6
| 12183 Caltonen ||  ||  || September 30, 1975 || Palomar || S. J. Bus || THM || align=right | 11 km || 
|-id=184 bgcolor=#fefefe
| 12184 Trevormerkley ||  ||  || September 30, 1975 || Palomar || S. J. Bus || — || align=right | 2.7 km || 
|-id=185 bgcolor=#E9E9E9
| 12185 Gasprinskij ||  ||  || September 24, 1976 || Nauchnij || N. S. Chernykh || — || align=right | 8.7 km || 
|-id=186 bgcolor=#d6d6d6
| 12186 Mitukurigen ||  ||  || March 12, 1977 || Kiso || H. Kosai, K. Furukawa || KOR || align=right | 6.2 km || 
|-id=187 bgcolor=#E9E9E9
| 12187 Lenagoryunova ||  ||  || September 11, 1977 || Nauchnij || N. S. Chernykh || — || align=right | 5.8 km || 
|-id=188 bgcolor=#fefefe
| 12188 Kalaallitnunaat || 1978 PE ||  || August 9, 1978 || La Silla || R. M. West || — || align=right | 3.3 km || 
|-id=189 bgcolor=#fefefe
| 12189 Dovgyj ||  ||  || September 5, 1978 || Nauchnij || N. S. Chernykh || V || align=right | 2.8 km || 
|-id=190 bgcolor=#E9E9E9
| 12190 Sarkisov ||  ||  || September 27, 1978 || Nauchnij || L. I. Chernykh || — || align=right | 6.0 km || 
|-id=191 bgcolor=#E9E9E9
| 12191 Vorontsova ||  ||  || October 9, 1978 || Nauchnij || L. V. Zhuravleva || — || align=right | 4.9 km || 
|-id=192 bgcolor=#d6d6d6
| 12192 Gregbollendonk ||  ||  || November 7, 1978 || Palomar || E. F. Helin, S. J. Bus || THM || align=right | 7.4 km || 
|-id=193 bgcolor=#E9E9E9
| 12193 || 1979 EL || — || March 4, 1979 || Anderson Mesa || N. G. Thomas || EUN || align=right | 9.4 km || 
|-id=194 bgcolor=#fefefe
| 12194 ||  || — || May 24, 1979 || Bickley || Perth Obs. || — || align=right | 5.0 km || 
|-id=195 bgcolor=#fefefe
| 12195 Johndavidniemann ||  ||  || June 25, 1979 || Siding Spring || E. F. Helin, S. J. Bus || — || align=right | 3.6 km || 
|-id=196 bgcolor=#fefefe
| 12196 Weems ||  ||  || June 25, 1979 || Siding Spring || E. F. Helin, S. J. Bus || — || align=right | 3.5 km || 
|-id=197 bgcolor=#E9E9E9
| 12197 Jan-Otto ||  ||  || March 16, 1980 || La Silla || C.-I. Lagerkvist || — || align=right | 4.6 km || 
|-id=198 bgcolor=#FA8072
| 12198 ||  || — || August 6, 1980 || La Silla || R. M. West || — || align=right | 2.8 km || 
|-id=199 bgcolor=#fefefe
| 12199 Sohlman ||  ||  || October 8, 1980 || Nauchnij || L. V. Zhuravleva || — || align=right | 4.7 km || 
|-id=200 bgcolor=#E9E9E9
| 12200 Richlipe ||  ||  || March 1, 1981 || Siding Spring || S. J. Bus || — || align=right | 5.2 km || 
|}

12201–12300 

|-bgcolor=#E9E9E9
| 12201 Spink ||  ||  || March 1, 1981 || Siding Spring || S. J. Bus || — || align=right | 2.9 km || 
|-id=202 bgcolor=#fefefe
| 12202 Toddgregory ||  ||  || March 1, 1981 || Siding Spring || S. J. Bus || — || align=right | 1.9 km || 
|-id=203 bgcolor=#d6d6d6
| 12203 Gehling ||  ||  || March 2, 1981 || Siding Spring || S. J. Bus || TEL || align=right | 4.0 km || 
|-id=204 bgcolor=#E9E9E9
| 12204 Jonpineau ||  ||  || March 2, 1981 || Siding Spring || S. J. Bus || — || align=right | 2.6 km || 
|-id=205 bgcolor=#E9E9E9
| 12205 Basharp ||  ||  || March 2, 1981 || Siding Spring || S. J. Bus || fast? || align=right | 2.8 km || 
|-id=206 bgcolor=#d6d6d6
| 12206 Prats ||  ||  || March 2, 1981 || Siding Spring || S. J. Bus || — || align=right | 6.2 km || 
|-id=207 bgcolor=#fefefe
| 12207 Matthewbeasley ||  ||  || March 1, 1981 || Siding Spring || S. J. Bus || FLO || align=right | 3.7 km || 
|-id=208 bgcolor=#E9E9E9
| 12208 Jacobenglander ||  ||  || March 2, 1981 || Siding Spring || S. J. Bus || — || align=right | 2.2 km || 
|-id=209 bgcolor=#E9E9E9
| 12209 ||  || — || March 11, 1981 || Siding Spring || S. J. Bus || — || align=right | 6.7 km || 
|-id=210 bgcolor=#fefefe
| 12210 Prykull ||  ||  || March 2, 1981 || Siding Spring || S. J. Bus || — || align=right | 2.1 km || 
|-id=211 bgcolor=#d6d6d6
| 12211 Arnoschmidt || 1981  ||  || May 28, 1981 || La Silla || H.-E. Schuster || — || align=right | 16 km || 
|-id=212 bgcolor=#fefefe
| 12212 ||  || — || August 23, 1981 || La Silla || H. Debehogne || — || align=right | 3.2 km || 
|-id=213 bgcolor=#d6d6d6
| 12213 ||  || — || August 26, 1981 || La Silla || H. Debehogne || — || align=right | 9.4 km || 
|-id=214 bgcolor=#d6d6d6
| 12214 Miroshnikov ||  ||  || September 7, 1981 || Nauchnij || L. G. Karachkina || — || align=right | 22 km || 
|-id=215 bgcolor=#fefefe
| 12215 Jessicalounsbury ||  ||  || October 24, 1981 || Palomar || S. J. Bus || V || align=right | 3.1 km || 
|-id=216 bgcolor=#fefefe
| 12216 ||  || — || November 16, 1981 || Bickley || Perth Obs. || V || align=right | 2.6 km || 
|-id=217 bgcolor=#fefefe
| 12217 ||  || — || May 15, 1982 || Palomar || Palomar Obs. || FLO || align=right | 2.5 km || 
|-id=218 bgcolor=#fefefe
| 12218 Fleischer || 1982 RK ||  || September 15, 1982 || Anderson Mesa || E. Bowell || FLOmoon || align=right | 5.0 km || 
|-id=219 bgcolor=#fefefe
| 12219 Grigorʹev ||  ||  || September 19, 1982 || Nauchnij || L. I. Chernykh || — || align=right | 3.1 km || 
|-id=220 bgcolor=#fefefe
| 12220 Semenchur ||  ||  || October 20, 1982 || Nauchnij || L. G. Karachkina || FLO || align=right | 3.0 km || 
|-id=221 bgcolor=#E9E9E9
| 12221 Ogatakoan ||  ||  || November 14, 1982 || Kiso || H. Kosai, K. Furukawa || — || align=right | 7.3 km || 
|-id=222 bgcolor=#E9E9E9
| 12222 Perotto || 1982 WA ||  || November 19, 1982 || Bologna || San Vittore Obs. || — || align=right | 8.7 km || 
|-id=223 bgcolor=#d6d6d6
| 12223 Hoskin || 1983 TX ||  || October 8, 1983 || Harvard Observatory || Oak Ridge Observatory || EOS || align=right | 7.6 km || 
|-id=224 bgcolor=#d6d6d6
| 12224 Jimcornell ||  ||  || October 19, 1984 || Harvard Observatory || Oak Ridge Observatory || KOR || align=right | 6.3 km || 
|-id=225 bgcolor=#fefefe
| 12225 Yanfernández || 1985 PQ ||  || August 14, 1985 || Anderson Mesa || E. Bowell || — || align=right | 4.1 km || 
|-id=226 bgcolor=#fefefe
| 12226 Caseylisse || 1985 TN ||  || October 15, 1985 || Anderson Mesa || E. Bowell || FLO || align=right | 2.7 km || 
|-id=227 bgcolor=#fefefe
| 12227 Penney ||  ||  || October 11, 1985 || Palomar || C. S. Shoemaker, E. M. Shoemaker || FLO || align=right | 2.1 km || 
|-id=228 bgcolor=#fefefe
| 12228 ||  || — || October 11, 1985 || Palomar || S. L. Gaiser, J. P. Leech || FLO || align=right | 4.3 km || 
|-id=229 bgcolor=#fefefe
| 12229 Paulsson ||  ||  || October 17, 1985 || Kvistaberg || C.-I. Lagerkvist || FLO || align=right | 4.2 km || 
|-id=230 bgcolor=#E9E9E9
| 12230 || 1986 QN || — || August 25, 1986 || La Silla || H. Debehogne || — || align=right | 5.2 km || 
|-id=231 bgcolor=#E9E9E9
| 12231 ||  || — || August 27, 1986 || La Silla || H. Debehogne || — || align=right | 7.9 km || 
|-id=232 bgcolor=#E9E9E9
| 12232 ||  || — || August 28, 1986 || La Silla || H. Debehogne || — || align=right | 5.9 km || 
|-id=233 bgcolor=#E9E9E9
| 12233 ||  || — || August 29, 1986 || La Silla || H. Debehogne || — || align=right | 3.1 km || 
|-id=234 bgcolor=#E9E9E9
| 12234 Shkuratov ||  ||  || September 6, 1986 || Anderson Mesa || E. Bowell || ADE || align=right | 11 km || 
|-id=235 bgcolor=#d6d6d6
| 12235 Imranakperov ||  ||  || September 9, 1986 || Nauchnij || L. G. Karachkina || URS || align=right | 25 km || 
|-id=236 bgcolor=#fefefe
| 12236 ||  || — || February 22, 1987 || La Silla || H. Debehogne || FLO || align=right | 2.7 km || 
|-id=237 bgcolor=#fefefe
| 12237 Coughlin || 1987 HE ||  || April 23, 1987 || Palomar || C. S. Shoemaker, E. M. Shoemaker || PHO || align=right | 4.8 km || 
|-id=238 bgcolor=#C2FFFF
| 12238 Actor ||  ||  || December 17, 1987 || La Silla || E. W. Elst, G. Pizarro || L4 || align=right | 30 km || 
|-id=239 bgcolor=#E9E9E9
| 12239 Carolinakou ||  ||  || February 13, 1988 || La Silla || E. W. Elst || — || align=right | 4.1 km || 
|-id=240 bgcolor=#fefefe
| 12240 Droste-Hülshoff ||  ||  || August 13, 1988 || Tautenburg Observatory || F. Börngen || NYS || align=right | 2.1 km || 
|-id=241 bgcolor=#fefefe
| 12241 Lefort ||  ||  || August 13, 1988 || Tautenburg Observatory || F. Börngen || EUT || align=right | 2.0 km || 
|-id=242 bgcolor=#C2FFFF
| 12242 Koon || 1988 QY ||  || August 18, 1988 || Palomar || C. S. Shoemaker, E. M. Shoemaker || L5 || align=right | 38 km || 
|-id=243 bgcolor=#d6d6d6
| 12243 ||  || — || September 9, 1988 || Brorfelde || P. Jensen || EOS || align=right | 9.9 km || 
|-id=244 bgcolor=#d6d6d6
| 12244 Werfel ||  ||  || September 8, 1988 || Tautenburg Observatory || F. Börngen || — || align=right | 12 km || 
|-id=245 bgcolor=#d6d6d6
| 12245 ||  || — || September 9, 1988 || La Silla || H. Debehogne || — || align=right | 7.0 km || 
|-id=246 bgcolor=#fefefe
| 12246 Pliska ||  ||  || September 11, 1988 || Smolyan || V. G. Ivanova || — || align=right | 4.8 km || 
|-id=247 bgcolor=#d6d6d6
| 12247 Michaelsekerak ||  ||  || September 14, 1988 || Cerro Tololo || S. J. Bus || — || align=right | 8.2 km || 
|-id=248 bgcolor=#d6d6d6
| 12248 Russellcarpenter ||  ||  || September 14, 1988 || Cerro Tololo || S. J. Bus || EOS || align=right | 8.6 km || 
|-id=249 bgcolor=#d6d6d6
| 12249 ||  || — || September 16, 1988 || Cerro Tololo || S. J. Bus || EOS || align=right | 9.4 km || 
|-id=250 bgcolor=#d6d6d6
| 12250 || 1988 TT || — || October 13, 1988 || Kushiro || S. Ueda, H. Kaneda || EOS || align=right | 7.6 km || 
|-id=251 bgcolor=#d6d6d6
| 12251 ||  || — || October 9, 1988 || Gekko || Y. Oshima || — || align=right | 6.2 km || 
|-id=252 bgcolor=#d6d6d6
| 12252 Gwangju ||  ||  || November 8, 1988 || Ayashi Station || M. Koishikawa || — || align=right | 7.5 km || 
|-id=253 bgcolor=#d6d6d6
| 12253 ||  || — || November 3, 1988 || Brorfelde || P. Jensen || — || align=right | 16 km || 
|-id=254 bgcolor=#d6d6d6
| 12254 ||  || — || December 7, 1988 || Okutama || T. Hioki, N. Kawasato || — || align=right | 19 km || 
|-id=255 bgcolor=#fefefe
| 12255 ||  || — || December 7, 1988 || Yorii || M. Arai, H. Mori || V || align=right | 3.8 km || 
|-id=256 bgcolor=#fefefe
| 12256 ||  || — || February 8, 1989 || La Silla || H. Debehogne || — || align=right | 3.9 km || 
|-id=257 bgcolor=#E9E9E9
| 12257 Lassine ||  ||  || April 3, 1989 || La Silla || E. W. Elst || EUN || align=right | 4.1 km || 
|-id=258 bgcolor=#E9E9E9
| 12258 Oscarwilde ||  ||  || April 3, 1989 || La Silla || E. W. Elst || — || align=right | 3.6 km || 
|-id=259 bgcolor=#fefefe
| 12259 Szukalski ||  ||  || September 26, 1989 || La Silla || E. W. Elst || — || align=right | 4.0 km || 
|-id=260 bgcolor=#d6d6d6
| 12260 ||  || — || September 30, 1989 || La Silla || H. Debehogne || KOR || align=right | 6.8 km || 
|-id=261 bgcolor=#fefefe
| 12261 Ledouanier ||  ||  || October 7, 1989 || La Silla || E. W. Elst || — || align=right | 2.3 km || 
|-id=262 bgcolor=#E9E9E9
| 12262 Nishio || 1989 UL ||  || October 21, 1989 || Kitami || K. Endate, K. Watanabe || — || align=right | 4.6 km || 
|-id=263 bgcolor=#fefefe
| 12263 ||  || — || December 30, 1989 || Siding Spring || R. H. McNaught || — || align=right | 3.5 km || 
|-id=264 bgcolor=#fefefe
| 12264 || 1990 CD || — || February 1, 1990 || Dynic || A. Sugie || — || align=right | 4.0 km || 
|-id=265 bgcolor=#fefefe
| 12265 || 1990 FG || — || March 23, 1990 || Palomar || E. F. Helin || H || align=right | 4.7 km || 
|-id=266 bgcolor=#fefefe
| 12266 || 1990 FL || — || March 23, 1990 || Palomar || E. F. Helin || PHO || align=right | 3.9 km || 
|-id=267 bgcolor=#fefefe
| 12267 Denneau ||  ||  || May 31, 1990 || Kitt Peak || Spacewatch || H || align=right | 1.4 km || 
|-id=268 bgcolor=#E9E9E9
| 12268 ||  || — || July 29, 1990 || Palomar || H. E. Holt || — || align=right | 6.7 km || 
|-id=269 bgcolor=#E9E9E9
| 12269 || 1990 QR || — || August 19, 1990 || Palomar || E. F. Helin || EUN || align=right | 9.8 km || 
|-id=270 bgcolor=#E9E9E9
| 12270 Bozar ||  ||  || August 16, 1990 || La Silla || E. W. Elst || — || align=right | 7.1 km || 
|-id=271 bgcolor=#E9E9E9
| 12271 ||  || — || September 14, 1990 || Palomar || H. E. Holt || — || align=right | 5.4 km || 
|-id=272 bgcolor=#E9E9E9
| 12272 Geddylee ||  ||  || September 22, 1990 || Palomar || B. Roman || EUN || align=right | 6.5 km || 
|-id=273 bgcolor=#E9E9E9
| 12273 ||  || — || October 9, 1990 || Siding Spring || R. H. McNaught || — || align=right | 11 km || 
|-id=274 bgcolor=#E9E9E9
| 12274 ||  || — || October 19, 1990 || Okutama || T. Hioki, S. Hayakawa || EUN || align=right | 5.7 km || 
|-id=275 bgcolor=#E9E9E9
| 12275 Marcelgoffin ||  ||  || November 15, 1990 || La Silla || E. W. Elst || GEF || align=right | 7.7 km || 
|-id=276 bgcolor=#E9E9E9
| 12276 IJzer ||  ||  || November 18, 1990 || La Silla || E. W. Elst || — || align=right | 5.9 km || 
|-id=277 bgcolor=#E9E9E9
| 12277 Tajimasatonokai ||  ||  || November 17, 1990 || Geisei || T. Seki || EUN || align=right | 5.9 km || 
|-id=278 bgcolor=#E9E9E9
| 12278 Kisohinoki ||  ||  || November 21, 1990 || Kitami || K. Endate, K. Watanabe || — || align=right | 5.4 km || 
|-id=279 bgcolor=#E9E9E9
| 12279 Laon ||  ||  || November 16, 1990 || La Silla || E. W. Elst || GEF || align=right | 7.9 km || 
|-id=280 bgcolor=#E9E9E9
| 12280 Reims ||  ||  || November 16, 1990 || La Silla || E. W. Elst || — || align=right | 4.8 km || 
|-id=281 bgcolor=#E9E9E9
| 12281 Chaumont ||  ||  || November 16, 1990 || La Silla || E. W. Elst || PAD || align=right | 16 km || 
|-id=282 bgcolor=#E9E9E9
| 12282 Crombecq ||  ||  || January 21, 1991 || Haute-Provence || E. W. Elst || — || align=right | 6.6 km || 
|-id=283 bgcolor=#d6d6d6
| 12283 || 1991 EC || — || March 9, 1991 || Dynic || A. Sugie || YAK || align=right | 14 km || 
|-id=284 bgcolor=#d6d6d6
| 12284 Pohl || 1991 FP ||  || March 17, 1991 || Palomar || E. F. Helin || THB || align=right | 11 km || 
|-id=285 bgcolor=#d6d6d6
| 12285 ||  || — || March 20, 1991 || La Silla || H. Debehogne || — || align=right | 9.7 km || 
|-id=286 bgcolor=#fefefe
| 12286 Poiseuille ||  ||  || April 8, 1991 || La Silla || E. W. Elst || — || align=right | 2.6 km || 
|-id=287 bgcolor=#d6d6d6
| 12287 Langres ||  ||  || April 8, 1991 || La Silla || E. W. Elst || HYG || align=right | 8.0 km || 
|-id=288 bgcolor=#fefefe
| 12288 Verdun ||  ||  || April 8, 1991 || La Silla || E. W. Elst || FLO || align=right | 3.4 km || 
|-id=289 bgcolor=#fefefe
| 12289 Carnot ||  ||  || April 8, 1991 || La Silla || E. W. Elst || — || align=right | 3.6 km || 
|-id=290 bgcolor=#fefefe
| 12290 || 1991 LZ || — || June 14, 1991 || Palomar || E. F. Helin || — || align=right | 3.6 km || 
|-id=291 bgcolor=#d6d6d6
| 12291 Gohnaumann ||  ||  || June 6, 1991 || La Silla || E. W. Elst || — || align=right | 13 km || 
|-id=292 bgcolor=#d6d6d6
| 12292 Dalton ||  ||  || June 6, 1991 || La Silla || E. W. Elst || HYG || align=right | 11 km || 
|-id=293 bgcolor=#fefefe
| 12293 ||  || — || July 13, 1991 || Palomar || H. E. Holt || V || align=right | 4.0 km || 
|-id=294 bgcolor=#fefefe
| 12294 Avogadro ||  ||  || August 2, 1991 || La Silla || E. W. Elst || — || align=right | 4.3 km || 
|-id=295 bgcolor=#fefefe
| 12295 Tasso ||  ||  || August 2, 1991 || La Silla || E. W. Elst || NYS || align=right | 4.2 km || 
|-id=296 bgcolor=#fefefe
| 12296 ||  || — || August 5, 1991 || Palomar || H. E. Holt || NYS || align=right | 3.4 km || 
|-id=297 bgcolor=#fefefe
| 12297 ||  || — || August 6, 1991 || Palomar || H. E. Holt || — || align=right | 3.9 km || 
|-id=298 bgcolor=#fefefe
| 12298 Brecht ||  ||  || August 6, 1991 || Tautenburg Observatory || F. Börngen || KLI || align=right | 6.6 km || 
|-id=299 bgcolor=#fefefe
| 12299 ||  || — || August 7, 1991 || Palomar || H. E. Holt || NYS || align=right | 3.3 km || 
|-id=300 bgcolor=#fefefe
| 12300 ||  || — || September 10, 1991 || Palomar || H. E. Holt || — || align=right | 4.1 km || 
|}

12301–12400 

|-bgcolor=#fefefe
| 12301 Eötvös ||  ||  || September 4, 1991 || La Silla || E. W. Elst || — || align=right | 2.9 km || 
|-id=302 bgcolor=#fefefe
| 12302 ||  || — || September 13, 1991 || Palomar || H. E. Holt || NYS || align=right | 3.0 km || 
|-id=303 bgcolor=#fefefe
| 12303 ||  || — || September 11, 1991 || Palomar || H. E. Holt || — || align=right | 2.9 km || 
|-id=304 bgcolor=#E9E9E9
| 12304 ||  || — || September 19, 1991 || Kiyosato || S. Otomo || EUN || align=right | 6.6 km || 
|-id=305 bgcolor=#E9E9E9
| 12305 ||  || — || October 12, 1991 || Siding Spring || R. H. McNaught || EUN || align=right | 4.5 km || 
|-id=306 bgcolor=#fefefe
| 12306 Pebronstein ||  ||  || October 7, 1991 || Palomar || C. P. de Saint-Aignan || NYS || align=right | 9.0 km || 
|-id=307 bgcolor=#d6d6d6
| 12307 || 1991 UA || — || October 18, 1991 || Kushiro || S. Ueda, H. Kaneda || SHU3:2 || align=right | 20 km || 
|-id=308 bgcolor=#E9E9E9
| 12308 ||  || — || November 4, 1991 || Dynic || A. Sugie || MAR || align=right | 6.1 km || 
|-id=309 bgcolor=#E9E9E9
| 12309 Tommygrav ||  ||  || February 25, 1992 || Kitt Peak || Spacewatch || — || align=right | 8.7 km || 
|-id=310 bgcolor=#E9E9E9
| 12310 Londontario ||  ||  || February 29, 1992 || Kitt Peak || Spacewatch || — || align=right | 8.4 km || 
|-id=311 bgcolor=#E9E9E9
| 12311 Ingemyr ||  ||  || March 1, 1992 || La Silla || UESAC || — || align=right | 5.5 km || 
|-id=312 bgcolor=#E9E9E9
| 12312 Väte ||  ||  || March 2, 1992 || La Silla || UESAC || — || align=right | 7.4 km || 
|-id=313 bgcolor=#E9E9E9
| 12313 ||  || — || March 6, 1992 || La Silla || UESAC || — || align=right | 3.4 km || 
|-id=314 bgcolor=#E9E9E9
| 12314 ||  || — || March 2, 1992 || La Silla || UESAC || — || align=right | 4.0 km || 
|-id=315 bgcolor=#E9E9E9
| 12315 ||  || — || March 28, 1992 || Kushiro || S. Ueda, H. Kaneda || PAD || align=right | 15 km || 
|-id=316 bgcolor=#d6d6d6
| 12316 || 1992 HG || — || April 27, 1992 || Kiyosato || S. Otomo || — || align=right | 17 km || 
|-id=317 bgcolor=#E9E9E9
| 12317 Madicampbell ||  ||  || April 24, 1992 || Kitt Peak || Spacewatch || HOF || align=right | 13 km || 
|-id=318 bgcolor=#d6d6d6
| 12318 Kästner ||  ||  || April 30, 1992 || Tautenburg Observatory || F. Börngen || — || align=right | 12 km || 
|-id=319 bgcolor=#fefefe
| 12319 || 1992 PC || — || August 2, 1992 || Harvard Observatory || Oak Ridge Observatory || FLO || align=right | 2.3 km || 
|-id=320 bgcolor=#fefefe
| 12320 Loschmidt ||  ||  || August 8, 1992 || Caussols || E. W. Elst || — || align=right | 2.1 km || 
|-id=321 bgcolor=#fefefe
| 12321 Zurakowski ||  ||  || August 4, 1992 || Palomar || H. E. Holt || FLO || align=right | 2.5 km || 
|-id=322 bgcolor=#fefefe
| 12322 || 1992 QW || — || August 31, 1992 || Palomar || E. F. Helin || FLO || align=right | 1.9 km || 
|-id=323 bgcolor=#fefefe
| 12323 Haeckel || 1992 RX ||  || September 4, 1992 || Tautenburg Observatory || F. Börngen, L. D. Schmadel || — || align=right | 3.1 km || 
|-id=324 bgcolor=#fefefe
| 12324 Van Rompaey ||  ||  || September 2, 1992 || La Silla || E. W. Elst || — || align=right | 2.8 km || 
|-id=325 bgcolor=#fefefe
| 12325 Bogota ||  ||  || September 2, 1992 || La Silla || E. W. Elst || FLO || align=right | 3.3 km || 
|-id=326 bgcolor=#fefefe
| 12326 Shirasaki || 1992 SF ||  || September 21, 1992 || Kitami || K. Endate, K. Watanabe || FLOmoon || align=right | 2.8 km || 
|-id=327 bgcolor=#fefefe
| 12327 Terbrüggen ||  ||  || September 21, 1992 || Tautenburg Observatory || L. D. Schmadel, F. Börngen || — || align=right | 6.0 km || 
|-id=328 bgcolor=#fefefe
| 12328 ||  || — || September 26, 1992 || Dynic || A. Sugie || FLO || align=right | 3.8 km || 
|-id=329 bgcolor=#fefefe
| 12329 Liebermann ||  ||  || September 23, 1992 || Tautenburg Observatory || F. Börngen || — || align=right | 3.3 km || 
|-id=330 bgcolor=#fefefe
| 12330 ||  || — || October 25, 1992 || Uenohara || N. Kawasato || FLO || align=right | 4.2 km || 
|-id=331 bgcolor=#fefefe
| 12331 ||  || — || October 31, 1992 || Uenohara || N. Kawasato || FLO || align=right | 4.1 km || 
|-id=332 bgcolor=#fefefe
| 12332 ||  || — || October 31, 1992 || Uenohara || N. Kawasato || — || align=right | 4.1 km || 
|-id=333 bgcolor=#fefefe
| 12333 ||  || — || November 18, 1992 || Kushiro || S. Ueda, H. Kaneda || V || align=right | 3.6 km || 
|-id=334 bgcolor=#fefefe
| 12334 ||  || — || November 18, 1992 || Dynic || A. Sugie || FLO || align=right | 5.0 km || 
|-id=335 bgcolor=#fefefe
| 12335 Tatsukushi ||  ||  || November 21, 1992 || Geisei || T. Seki || — || align=right | 4.7 km || 
|-id=336 bgcolor=#fefefe
| 12336 ||  || — || November 23, 1992 || Oohira || T. Urata || PHO || align=right | 6.1 km || 
|-id=337 bgcolor=#fefefe
| 12337 ||  || — || November 24, 1992 || Yatsugatake || Y. Kushida, O. Muramatsu || — || align=right | 4.6 km || 
|-id=338 bgcolor=#fefefe
| 12338 || 1992 XE || — || December 14, 1992 || Kiyosato || S. Otomo || FLO || align=right | 3.9 km || 
|-id=339 bgcolor=#fefefe
| 12339 Carloo ||  ||  || December 18, 1992 || Caussols || E. W. Elst || — || align=right | 3.8 km || 
|-id=340 bgcolor=#fefefe
| 12340 Stalle ||  ||  || December 18, 1992 || Caussols || E. W. Elst || V || align=right | 4.6 km || 
|-id=341 bgcolor=#fefefe
| 12341 Calevoet ||  ||  || January 27, 1993 || Caussols || E. W. Elst || NYS || align=right | 2.6 km || 
|-id=342 bgcolor=#fefefe
| 12342 Kudohmichiko ||  ||  || January 30, 1993 || Yatsugatake || Y. Kushida, O. Muramatsu || — || align=right | 7.0 km || 
|-id=343 bgcolor=#E9E9E9
| 12343 Martinbeech ||  ||  || February 26, 1993 || Kitt Peak || Spacewatch || — || align=right | 5.5 km || 
|-id=344 bgcolor=#E9E9E9
| 12344 ||  || — || March 18, 1993 || Hidaka || S. Shirai, S. Hayakawa || RAF || align=right | 4.6 km || 
|-id=345 bgcolor=#fefefe
| 12345 ||  || — || March 17, 1993 || La Silla || UESAC || NYS || align=right | 3.0 km || 
|-id=346 bgcolor=#fefefe
| 12346 ||  || — || March 21, 1993 || La Silla || UESAC || NYS || align=right | 3.1 km || 
|-id=347 bgcolor=#E9E9E9
| 12347 ||  || — || March 19, 1993 || La Silla || UESAC || ADE || align=right | 3.7 km || 
|-id=348 bgcolor=#E9E9E9
| 12348 ||  || — || March 19, 1993 || La Silla || UESAC || — || align=right | 4.1 km || 
|-id=349 bgcolor=#E9E9E9
| 12349 Akebonozou || 1993 GO ||  || April 14, 1993 || Dynic || A. Sugie || — || align=right | 11 km || 
|-id=350 bgcolor=#E9E9E9
| 12350 Feuchtwanger ||  ||  || April 23, 1993 || Tautenburg Observatory || F. Börngen || — || align=right | 4.9 km || 
|-id=351 bgcolor=#E9E9E9
| 12351 || 1993 JD || — || May 14, 1993 || Kiyosato || S. Otomo || EUN || align=right | 5.5 km || 
|-id=352 bgcolor=#d6d6d6
| 12352 Jepejacobsen ||  ||  || July 20, 1993 || La Silla || E. W. Elst || — || align=right | 16 km || 
|-id=353 bgcolor=#d6d6d6
| 12353 Màrquez ||  ||  || July 20, 1993 || La Silla || E. W. Elst || KOR || align=right | 5.7 km || 
|-id=354 bgcolor=#d6d6d6
| 12354 Hemmerechts ||  ||  || August 18, 1993 || Caussols || E. W. Elst || EOS || align=right | 8.2 km || 
|-id=355 bgcolor=#d6d6d6
| 12355 Coelho ||  ||  || August 18, 1993 || Caussols || E. W. Elst || KOR || align=right | 6.0 km || 
|-id=356 bgcolor=#d6d6d6
| 12356 Carlscheele ||  ||  || September 15, 1993 || La Silla || E. W. Elst || KOR || align=right | 6.0 km || 
|-id=357 bgcolor=#d6d6d6
| 12357 Toyako ||  ||  || September 16, 1993 || Kitami || K. Endate, K. Watanabe || — || align=right | 15 km || 
|-id=358 bgcolor=#E9E9E9
| 12358 Azzurra ||  ||  || September 22, 1993 || Stroncone || A. Vagnozzi || — || align=right | 12 km || 
|-id=359 bgcolor=#d6d6d6
| 12359 Cajigal ||  ||  || September 22, 1993 || Mérida || O. A. Naranjo || THM || align=right | 13 km || 
|-id=360 bgcolor=#d6d6d6
| 12360 Unilandes ||  ||  || September 22, 1993 || Mérida || O. A. Naranjo || THM || align=right | 10 km || 
|-id=361 bgcolor=#d6d6d6
| 12361 || 1993 TB || — || October 9, 1993 || Uenohara || N. Kawasato || THM || align=right | 7.9 km || 
|-id=362 bgcolor=#d6d6d6
| 12362 Mumuryk ||  ||  || October 15, 1993 || Kitami || K. Endate, K. Watanabe || — || align=right | 13 km || 
|-id=363 bgcolor=#d6d6d6
| 12363 Marinmarais ||  ||  || October 9, 1993 || La Silla || E. W. Elst || THM || align=right | 12 km || 
|-id=364 bgcolor=#fefefe
| 12364 Asadagouryu ||  ||  || December 15, 1993 || Ōizumi || T. Kobayashi || — || align=right | 2.8 km || 
|-id=365 bgcolor=#d6d6d6
| 12365 Yoshitoki || 1993 YD ||  || December 17, 1993 || Ōizumi || T. Kobayashi || — || align=right | 28 km || 
|-id=366 bgcolor=#fefefe
| 12366 Luisapla ||  ||  || February 8, 1994 || Mérida || O. A. Naranjo || FLO || align=right | 3.3 km || 
|-id=367 bgcolor=#fefefe
| 12367 Ourinhos ||  ||  || February 8, 1994 || Mérida || O. A. Naranjo || — || align=right | 3.4 km || 
|-id=368 bgcolor=#fefefe
| 12368 Mutsaers ||  ||  || February 7, 1994 || La Silla || E. W. Elst || — || align=right | 3.7 km || 
|-id=369 bgcolor=#fefefe
| 12369 Pirandello ||  ||  || February 8, 1994 || La Silla || E. W. Elst || FLO || align=right | 4.0 km || 
|-id=370 bgcolor=#fefefe
| 12370 Kageyasu ||  ||  || April 11, 1994 || Kushiro || S. Ueda, H. Kaneda || — || align=right | 3.7 km || 
|-id=371 bgcolor=#fefefe
| 12371 ||  || — || April 14, 1994 || Kiyosato || S. Otomo || FLO || align=right | 2.9 km || 
|-id=372 bgcolor=#fefefe
| 12372 Kagesuke || 1994 JF ||  || May 6, 1994 || Ōizumi || T. Kobayashi || FLO || align=right | 2.9 km || 
|-id=373 bgcolor=#fefefe
| 12373 Lancearmstrong ||  ||  || May 15, 1994 || Palomar || C. P. de Saint-Aignan || V || align=right | 3.3 km || 
|-id=374 bgcolor=#E9E9E9
| 12374 Rakhat ||  ||  || May 15, 1994 || Palomar || C. P. de Saint-Aignan || — || align=right | 4.6 km || 
|-id=375 bgcolor=#fefefe
| 12375 ||  || — || July 8, 1994 || Caussols || E. W. Elst || — || align=right | 4.0 km || 
|-id=376 bgcolor=#E9E9E9
| 12376 Cochabamba ||  ||  || July 8, 1994 || Caussols || E. W. Elst || — || align=right | 5.3 km || 
|-id=377 bgcolor=#E9E9E9
| 12377 || 1994 PP || — || August 11, 1994 || Palomar || E. F. Helin || PAL || align=right | 11 km || 
|-id=378 bgcolor=#E9E9E9
| 12378 Johnston ||  ||  || August 15, 1994 || Siding Spring || R. H. McNaught || — || align=right | 8.0 km || 
|-id=379 bgcolor=#E9E9E9
| 12379 Thulin ||  ||  || August 10, 1994 || La Silla || E. W. Elst || — || align=right | 6.0 km || 
|-id=380 bgcolor=#E9E9E9
| 12380 Sciascia ||  ||  || August 10, 1994 || La Silla || E. W. Elst || NEM || align=right | 10 km || 
|-id=381 bgcolor=#E9E9E9
| 12381 Hugoclaus ||  ||  || August 12, 1994 || La Silla || E. W. Elst || GEF || align=right | 5.3 km || 
|-id=382 bgcolor=#E9E9E9
| 12382 Niagara Falls ||  ||  || September 28, 1994 || Kitt Peak || Spacewatch || AST || align=right | 6.5 km || 
|-id=383 bgcolor=#d6d6d6
| 12383 Eboshi ||  ||  || October 2, 1994 || Kitami || K. Endate, K. Watanabe || — || align=right | 11 km || 
|-id=384 bgcolor=#d6d6d6
| 12384 Luigimartella ||  ||  || October 10, 1994 || Colleverde || V. S. Casulli || EOS || align=right | 9.4 km || 
|-id=385 bgcolor=#d6d6d6
| 12385 || 1994 UO || — || October 31, 1994 || Ōizumi || T. Kobayashi || KOR || align=right | 5.6 km || 
|-id=386 bgcolor=#d6d6d6
| 12386 Nikolova ||  ||  || October 28, 1994 || Kitt Peak || Spacewatch || — || align=right | 7.1 km || 
|-id=387 bgcolor=#E9E9E9
| 12387 Tomokofujiwara ||  ||  || October 28, 1994 || Kitami || K. Endate, K. Watanabe || — || align=right | 11 km || 
|-id=388 bgcolor=#d6d6d6
| 12388 Kikunokai ||  ||  || November 1, 1994 || Kitami || K. Endate, K. Watanabe || KOR || align=right | 5.6 km || 
|-id=389 bgcolor=#d6d6d6
| 12389 || 1994 WU || — || November 25, 1994 || Ōizumi || T. Kobayashi || MEL || align=right | 20 km || 
|-id=390 bgcolor=#FA8072
| 12390 ||  || — || November 27, 1994 || Ōizumi || T. Kobayashi || H || align=right | 3.0 km || 
|-id=391 bgcolor=#E9E9E9
| 12391 Ecoadachi ||  ||  || November 26, 1994 || Kitami || K. Endate, K. Watanabe || — || align=right | 8.6 km || 
|-id=392 bgcolor=#E9E9E9
| 12392 ||  || — || November 30, 1994 || Ōizumi || T. Kobayashi || DOR || align=right | 8.2 km || 
|-id=393 bgcolor=#d6d6d6
| 12393 ||  || — || December 28, 1994 || Ōizumi || T. Kobayashi || THM || align=right | 9.6 km || 
|-id=394 bgcolor=#d6d6d6
| 12394 || 1995 BQ || — || January 23, 1995 || Ōizumi || T. Kobayashi || — || align=right | 9.2 km || 
|-id=395 bgcolor=#d6d6d6
| 12395 Richnelson ||  ||  || February 8, 1995 || Siding Spring || D. J. Asher || ALA || align=right | 16 km || 
|-id=396 bgcolor=#d6d6d6
| 12396 Amyphillips ||  ||  || February 24, 1995 || Catalina Station || C. W. Hergenrother || — || align=right | 14 km || 
|-id=397 bgcolor=#d6d6d6
| 12397 Peterbrown ||  ||  || March 27, 1995 || Kitt Peak || Spacewatch || — || align=right | 15 km || 
|-id=398 bgcolor=#fefefe
| 12398 Pickhardt ||  ||  || May 25, 1995 || Kitt Peak || Spacewatch || — || align=right | 1.9 km || 
|-id=399 bgcolor=#fefefe
| 12399 Bartolini || 1995 OD ||  || July 19, 1995 || San Marcello || A. Boattini, L. Tesi || — || align=right | 2.8 km || 
|-id=400 bgcolor=#fefefe
| 12400 Katumaru ||  ||  || July 28, 1995 || Nanyo || T. Okuni || — || align=right | 3.9 km || 
|}

12401–12500 

|-bgcolor=#fefefe
| 12401 Tucholsky ||  ||  || July 21, 1995 || Tautenburg Observatory || F. Börngen || MAS || align=right | 2.7 km || 
|-id=402 bgcolor=#fefefe
| 12402 || 1995 PK || — || August 3, 1995 || Kiyosato || S. Otomo || — || align=right | 4.0 km || 
|-id=403 bgcolor=#fefefe
| 12403 ||  || — || August 31, 1995 || Ōizumi || T. Kobayashi || NYS || align=right | 4.2 km || 
|-id=404 bgcolor=#fefefe
| 12404 ||  || — || August 31, 1995 || Catalina Station || T. B. Spahr || — || align=right | 3.2 km || 
|-id=405 bgcolor=#fefefe
| 12405 Nespoli || 1995 RK ||  || September 15, 1995 || Sormano || F. Manca, V. Giuliani || V || align=right | 2.4 km || 
|-id=406 bgcolor=#fefefe
| 12406 Zvíkov ||  ||  || September 25, 1995 || Kleť || M. Tichý, Z. Moravec || — || align=right | 3.0 km || 
|-id=407 bgcolor=#fefefe
| 12407 Riccardi ||  ||  || September 23, 1995 || Bologna || San Vittore Obs. || V || align=right | 3.5 km || 
|-id=408 bgcolor=#fefefe
| 12408 Fujioka ||  ||  || September 20, 1995 || Kuma Kogen || A. Nakamura || V || align=right | 2.3 km || 
|-id=409 bgcolor=#fefefe
| 12409 Bukovanská ||  ||  || September 28, 1995 || Kleť || Kleť Obs. || MAS || align=right | 1.6 km || 
|-id=410 bgcolor=#fefefe
| 12410 Donald Duck ||  ||  || September 26, 1995 || Sormano || P. Sicoli, P. Ghezzi || — || align=right | 5.3 km || 
|-id=411 bgcolor=#fefefe
| 12411 Tannokayo ||  ||  || September 20, 1995 || Kitami || K. Endate, K. Watanabe || V || align=right | 3.8 km || 
|-id=412 bgcolor=#fefefe
| 12412 Muchisachie ||  ||  || September 20, 1995 || Kitami || K. Endate, K. Watanabe || V || align=right | 4.7 km || 
|-id=413 bgcolor=#fefefe
| 12413 Johnnyweir ||  ||  || September 26, 1995 || Zelenchukskaya || T. V. Kryachko || NYS || align=right | 5.7 km || 
|-id=414 bgcolor=#fefefe
| 12414 Bure ||  ||  || September 26, 1995 || Zelenchukskaya || T. V. Kryachko || MAS || align=right | 3.1 km || 
|-id=415 bgcolor=#fefefe
| 12415 Wakatatakayo ||  ||  || September 22, 1995 || Kitami || K. Endate, K. Watanabe || — || align=right | 4.3 km || 
|-id=416 bgcolor=#fefefe
| 12416 || 1995 TS || — || October 2, 1995 || Ōizumi || T. Kobayashi || MAS || align=right | 6.2 km || 
|-id=417 bgcolor=#fefefe
| 12417 ||  || — || October 2, 1995 || Kiyosato || S. Otomo || FLO || align=right | 3.8 km || 
|-id=418 bgcolor=#d6d6d6
| 12418 Tongling ||  ||  || October 23, 1995 || Xinglong || SCAP || — || align=right | 9.5 km || 
|-id=419 bgcolor=#fefefe
| 12419 ||  || — || October 25, 1995 || Ōizumi || T. Kobayashi || — || align=right | 3.6 km || 
|-id=420 bgcolor=#E9E9E9
| 12420 ||  || — || October 25, 1995 || Ōizumi || T. Kobayashi || EUN || align=right | 5.8 km || 
|-id=421 bgcolor=#fefefe
| 12421 Zhenya ||  ||  || October 16, 1995 || Zelenchukskaya || T. V. Kryachko || SUL || align=right | 8.0 km || 
|-id=422 bgcolor=#fefefe
| 12422 ||  || — || October 27, 1995 || Kushiro || S. Ueda, H. Kaneda || — || align=right | 5.9 km || 
|-id=423 bgcolor=#E9E9E9
| 12423 Slotin ||  ||  || October 17, 1995 || Kitt Peak || Spacewatch || — || align=right | 4.3 km || 
|-id=424 bgcolor=#E9E9E9
| 12424 || 1995 VM || — || November 2, 1995 || Ōizumi || T. Kobayashi || EUNslow || align=right | 6.2 km || 
|-id=425 bgcolor=#fefefe
| 12425 ||  || — || November 12, 1995 || Nachi-Katsuura || Y. Shimizu, T. Urata || V || align=right | 4.7 km || 
|-id=426 bgcolor=#fefefe
| 12426 Racquetball ||  ||  || November 14, 1995 || Haleakalā || AMOS || — || align=right | 4.6 km || 
|-id=427 bgcolor=#E9E9E9
| 12427 ||  || — || November 21, 1995 || Farra d'Isonzo || Farra d'Isonzo || — || align=right | 2.6 km || 
|-id=428 bgcolor=#E9E9E9
| 12428 ||  || — || November 24, 1995 || Ōizumi || T. Kobayashi || — || align=right | 6.9 km || 
|-id=429 bgcolor=#fefefe
| 12429 ||  || — || November 26, 1995 || Ōizumi || T. Kobayashi || NYS || align=right | 8.4 km || 
|-id=430 bgcolor=#fefefe
| 12430 ||  || — || December 14, 1995 || Xinglong || SCAP || — || align=right | 4.0 km || 
|-id=431 bgcolor=#E9E9E9
| 12431 Webster ||  ||  || December 18, 1995 || Kitt Peak || Spacewatch || — || align=right | 4.1 km || 
|-id=432 bgcolor=#d6d6d6
| 12432 Usuda ||  ||  || January 12, 1996 || Chichibu || N. Satō, T. Urata || — || align=right | 8.0 km || 
|-id=433 bgcolor=#E9E9E9
| 12433 Barbieri ||  ||  || January 15, 1996 || Cima Ekar || M. Tombelli, U. Munari || — || align=right | 3.6 km || 
|-id=434 bgcolor=#E9E9E9
| 12434 || 1996 BM || — || January 16, 1996 || Ōizumi || T. Kobayashi || — || align=right | 6.9 km || 
|-id=435 bgcolor=#d6d6d6
| 12435 Sudachi || 1996 BX ||  || January 17, 1996 || Kitami || K. Endate, K. Watanabe || KOR || align=right | 6.2 km || 
|-id=436 bgcolor=#E9E9E9
| 12436 ||  || — || January 24, 1996 || Ōizumi || T. Kobayashi || GEF || align=right | 6.4 km || 
|-id=437 bgcolor=#d6d6d6
| 12437 Westlane ||  ||  || January 18, 1996 || Kitt Peak || Spacewatch || — || align=right | 8.5 km || 
|-id=438 bgcolor=#E9E9E9
| 12438 || 1996 CZ || — || February 9, 1996 || Cloudcroft || W. Offutt || — || align=right | 5.1 km || 
|-id=439 bgcolor=#d6d6d6
| 12439 Okasaki ||  ||  || February 15, 1996 || Nanyo || T. Okuni || THM || align=right | 14 km || 
|-id=440 bgcolor=#d6d6d6
| 12440 Koshigayaboshi ||  ||  || February 11, 1996 || Kitami || K. Endate, K. Watanabe || — || align=right | 20 km || 
|-id=441 bgcolor=#d6d6d6
| 12441 || 1996 DV || — || February 19, 1996 || Ōizumi || T. Kobayashi || — || align=right | 6.0 km || 
|-id=442 bgcolor=#d6d6d6
| 12442 Beltramemass ||  ||  || February 23, 1996 || Stroncone || Santa Lucia Obs. || — || align=right | 11 km || 
|-id=443 bgcolor=#d6d6d6
| 12443 Paulsydney ||  ||  || March 15, 1996 || Haleakalā || AMOS || TIR || align=right | 8.9 km || 
|-id=444 bgcolor=#C2FFFF
| 12444 Prothoon ||  ||  || April 15, 1996 || La Silla || E. W. Elst || L5 || align=right | 64 km || 
|-id=445 bgcolor=#d6d6d6
| 12445 Sirataka ||  ||  || April 24, 1996 || Nanyo || T. Okuni || — || align=right | 11 km || 
|-id=446 bgcolor=#fefefe
| 12446 Juliabryant ||  ||  || August 15, 1996 || Macquarie || R. H. McNaught, J. B. Child || H || align=right | 2.3 km || 
|-id=447 bgcolor=#fefefe
| 12447 Yatescup ||  ||  || December 4, 1996 || Kitt Peak || Spacewatch || — || align=right | 3.2 km || 
|-id=448 bgcolor=#fefefe
| 12448 Mr. Tompkins ||  ||  || December 12, 1996 || Kleť || M. Tichý, Z. Moravec || V || align=right | 3.4 km || 
|-id=449 bgcolor=#fefefe
| 12449 ||  || — || December 14, 1996 || Ōizumi || T. Kobayashi || — || align=right | 4.4 km || 
|-id=450 bgcolor=#fefefe
| 12450 || 1996 YD || — || December 20, 1996 || Ōizumi || T. Kobayashi || — || align=right | 4.2 km || 
|-id=451 bgcolor=#fefefe
| 12451 || 1996 YF || — || December 20, 1996 || Ōizumi || T. Kobayashi || FLO || align=right | 3.2 km || 
|-id=452 bgcolor=#fefefe
| 12452 || 1996 YO || — || December 20, 1996 || Ōizumi || T. Kobayashi || — || align=right | 2.1 km || 
|-id=453 bgcolor=#E9E9E9
| 12453 || 1996 YY || — || December 20, 1996 || Ōizumi || T. Kobayashi || — || align=right | 7.1 km || 
|-id=454 bgcolor=#fefefe
| 12454 ||  || — || December 18, 1996 || Xinglong || SCAP || NYS || align=right | 6.4 km || 
|-id=455 bgcolor=#fefefe
| 12455 || 1997 AR || — || January 2, 1997 || Ōizumi || T. Kobayashi || NYS || align=right | 5.7 km || 
|-id=456 bgcolor=#fefefe
| 12456 Genichiaraki ||  ||  || January 2, 1997 || Chichibu || N. Satō || — || align=right | 3.3 km || 
|-id=457 bgcolor=#fefefe
| 12457 ||  || — || January 2, 1997 || Ōizumi || T. Kobayashi || FLO || align=right | 3.7 km || 
|-id=458 bgcolor=#fefefe
| 12458 ||  || — || January 2, 1997 || Ōizumi || T. Kobayashi || NYS || align=right | 2.8 km || 
|-id=459 bgcolor=#fefefe
| 12459 ||  || — || January 6, 1997 || Ōizumi || T. Kobayashi || FLO || align=right | 2.4 km || 
|-id=460 bgcolor=#fefefe
| 12460 Mando ||  ||  || January 3, 1997 || Chichibu || N. Satō || V || align=right | 2.2 km || 
|-id=461 bgcolor=#fefefe
| 12461 ||  || — || January 7, 1997 || Ōizumi || T. Kobayashi || — || align=right | 3.6 km || 
|-id=462 bgcolor=#E9E9E9
| 12462 ||  || — || January 7, 1997 || Ōizumi || T. Kobayashi || — || align=right | 5.3 km || 
|-id=463 bgcolor=#fefefe
| 12463 ||  || — || January 9, 1997 || Ōizumi || T. Kobayashi || — || align=right | 5.2 km || 
|-id=464 bgcolor=#fefefe
| 12464 Manhattan ||  ||  || January 2, 1997 || Kitt Peak || Spacewatch || V || align=right | 2.6 km || 
|-id=465 bgcolor=#fefefe
| 12465 Perth Amboy ||  ||  || January 3, 1997 || Kitt Peak || Spacewatch || slow || align=right | 5.2 km || 
|-id=466 bgcolor=#fefefe
| 12466 ||  || — || January 10, 1997 || Ōizumi || T. Kobayashi || — || align=right | 4.7 km || 
|-id=467 bgcolor=#fefefe
| 12467 ||  || — || January 15, 1997 || Ōizumi || T. Kobayashi || — || align=right | 2.3 km || 
|-id=468 bgcolor=#fefefe
| 12468 Zachotín ||  ||  || January 14, 1997 || Ondřejov || L. Kotková || — || align=right | 3.4 km || 
|-id=469 bgcolor=#fefefe
| 12469 Katsuura ||  ||  || January 9, 1997 || Chichibu || N. Satō || FLO || align=right | 2.7 km || 
|-id=470 bgcolor=#fefefe
| 12470 Pinotti ||  ||  || January 31, 1997 || Cima Ekar || M. Tombelli || — || align=right | 4.6 km || 
|-id=471 bgcolor=#fefefe
| 12471 Larryscherr ||  ||  || February 6, 1997 || Haleakalā || NEAT || NYS || align=right | 3.4 km || 
|-id=472 bgcolor=#fefefe
| 12472 Samadhi ||  ||  || February 3, 1997 || Kitt Peak || Spacewatch || — || align=right | 2.9 km || 
|-id=473 bgcolor=#E9E9E9
| 12473 Levi-Civita ||  ||  || February 10, 1997 || Prescott || P. G. Comba || EUN || align=right | 4.2 km || 
|-id=474 bgcolor=#fefefe
| 12474 ||  || — || February 12, 1997 || Ōizumi || T. Kobayashi || — || align=right | 4.1 km || 
|-id=475 bgcolor=#E9E9E9
| 12475 ||  || — || February 12, 1997 || Ōizumi || T. Kobayashi || — || align=right | 6.7 km || 
|-id=476 bgcolor=#fefefe
| 12476 ||  || — || March 4, 1997 || Ōizumi || T. Kobayashi || NYS || align=right | 2.9 km || 
|-id=477 bgcolor=#fefefe
| 12477 Haiku ||  ||  || March 4, 1997 || Kitt Peak || Spacewatch || NYS || align=right | 3.3 km || 
|-id=478 bgcolor=#fefefe
| 12478 Suzukiseiji ||  ||  || March 7, 1997 || Nanyo || T. Okuni || NYS || align=right | 2.7 km || 
|-id=479 bgcolor=#fefefe
| 12479 Ohshimaosamu ||  ||  || March 5, 1997 || Kitt Peak || Spacewatch || V || align=right | 2.4 km || 
|-id=480 bgcolor=#E9E9E9
| 12480 ||  || — || March 9, 1997 || Xinglong || SCAP || — || align=right | 3.0 km || 
|-id=481 bgcolor=#E9E9E9
| 12481 Streuvels ||  ||  || March 12, 1997 || La Silla || E. W. Elst || — || align=right | 13 km || 
|-id=482 bgcolor=#fefefe
| 12482 Pajka ||  ||  || March 23, 1997 || Modra || A. Galád, A. Pravda || — || align=right | 4.1 km || 
|-id=483 bgcolor=#d6d6d6
| 12483 ||  || — || March 28, 1997 || Xinglong || SCAP || — || align=right | 9.2 km || 
|-id=484 bgcolor=#E9E9E9
| 12484 ||  || — || March 31, 1997 || Socorro || LINEAR || — || align=right | 6.7 km || 
|-id=485 bgcolor=#fefefe
| 12485 Jenniferharris ||  ||  || April 7, 1997 || Haleakalā || NEAT || NYS || align=right | 3.2 km || 
|-id=486 bgcolor=#fefefe
| 12486 ||  || — || April 2, 1997 || Socorro || LINEAR || — || align=right | 4.4 km || 
|-id=487 bgcolor=#d6d6d6
| 12487 ||  || — || April 2, 1997 || Socorro || LINEAR || — || align=right | 8.1 km || 
|-id=488 bgcolor=#E9E9E9
| 12488 ||  || — || April 3, 1997 || Socorro || LINEAR || HEN || align=right | 3.5 km || 
|-id=489 bgcolor=#E9E9E9
| 12489 ||  || — || April 7, 1997 || Socorro || LINEAR || — || align=right | 4.5 km || 
|-id=490 bgcolor=#d6d6d6
| 12490 Leiden ||  ||  || May 3, 1997 || La Silla || E. W. Elst || THM || align=right | 6.5 km || 
|-id=491 bgcolor=#d6d6d6
| 12491 Musschenbroek ||  ||  || May 3, 1997 || La Silla || E. W. Elst || KOR || align=right | 7.1 km || 
|-id=492 bgcolor=#d6d6d6
| 12492 Tanais ||  ||  || May 3, 1997 || La Silla || E. W. Elst || — || align=right | 7.3 km || 
|-id=493 bgcolor=#d6d6d6
| 12493 Minkowski ||  ||  || August 4, 1997 || Prescott || P. G. Comba || HYG || align=right | 11 km || 
|-id=494 bgcolor=#fefefe
| 12494 Doughamilton ||  ||  || February 25, 1998 || Haleakalā || NEAT || H || align=right | 2.6 km || 
|-id=495 bgcolor=#fefefe
| 12495 || 1998 FJ || — || March 18, 1998 || Woomera || F. B. Zoltowski || — || align=right | 2.4 km || 
|-id=496 bgcolor=#fefefe
| 12496 Ekholm ||  ||  || March 22, 1998 || Kitt Peak || Spacewatch || NYS || align=right | 3.1 km || 
|-id=497 bgcolor=#E9E9E9
| 12497 Ekkehard ||  ||  || March 26, 1998 || Caussols || ODAS || — || align=right | 4.5 km || 
|-id=498 bgcolor=#E9E9E9
| 12498 Dragesco ||  ||  || March 26, 1998 || Caussols || ODAS || — || align=right | 4.2 km || 
|-id=499 bgcolor=#fefefe
| 12499 ||  || — || March 20, 1998 || Socorro || LINEAR || FLO || align=right | 4.6 km || 
|-id=500 bgcolor=#fefefe
| 12500 Desngai ||  ||  || March 20, 1998 || Socorro || LINEAR || — || align=right | 2.7 km || 
|}

12501–12600 

|-bgcolor=#fefefe
| 12501 Nord ||  ||  || March 20, 1998 || Socorro || LINEAR || — || align=right | 4.0 km || 
|-id=502 bgcolor=#fefefe
| 12502 ||  || — || March 20, 1998 || Socorro || LINEAR || NYS || align=right | 2.8 km || 
|-id=503 bgcolor=#E9E9E9
| 12503 ||  || — || March 24, 1998 || Socorro || LINEAR || GEF || align=right | 4.3 km || 
|-id=504 bgcolor=#fefefe
| 12504 Nuest ||  ||  || March 24, 1998 || Socorro || LINEAR || — || align=right | 3.9 km || 
|-id=505 bgcolor=#fefefe
| 12505 ||  || — || March 24, 1998 || Socorro || LINEAR || FLO || align=right | 3.6 km || 
|-id=506 bgcolor=#fefefe
| 12506 Pariser ||  ||  || March 31, 1998 || Socorro || LINEAR || — || align=right | 3.5 km || 
|-id=507 bgcolor=#E9E9E9
| 12507 ||  || — || March 31, 1998 || Socorro || LINEAR || DOR || align=right | 12 km || 
|-id=508 bgcolor=#fefefe
| 12508 ||  || — || March 31, 1998 || Socorro || LINEAR || — || align=right | 3.3 km || 
|-id=509 bgcolor=#fefefe
| 12509 Pathak ||  ||  || March 31, 1998 || Socorro || LINEAR || FLO || align=right | 2.3 km || 
|-id=510 bgcolor=#fefefe
| 12510 ||  || — || March 20, 1998 || Socorro || LINEAR || — || align=right | 3.2 km || 
|-id=511 bgcolor=#fefefe
| 12511 Patil ||  ||  || March 20, 1998 || Socorro || LINEAR || — || align=right | 5.5 km || 
|-id=512 bgcolor=#fefefe
| 12512 Split ||  ||  || April 21, 1998 || Višnjan Observatory || K. Korlević, M. Dusić || FLO || align=right | 4.6 km || 
|-id=513 bgcolor=#fefefe
| 12513 Niven ||  ||  || April 27, 1998 || Prescott || P. G. Comba || — || align=right | 2.5 km || 
|-id=514 bgcolor=#E9E9E9
| 12514 Schommer ||  ||  || April 20, 1998 || Kitt Peak || Spacewatch || — || align=right | 4.1 km || 
|-id=515 bgcolor=#fefefe
| 12515 Suiseki ||  ||  || April 30, 1998 || Kitt Peak || Spacewatch || — || align=right | 3.9 km || 
|-id=516 bgcolor=#fefefe
| 12516 ||  || — || April 20, 1998 || Socorro || LINEAR || — || align=right | 2.9 km || 
|-id=517 bgcolor=#fefefe
| 12517 Grayzeck ||  ||  || April 30, 1998 || Anderson Mesa || LONEOS || EUT || align=right | 1.6 km || 
|-id=518 bgcolor=#fefefe
| 12518 ||  || — || April 27, 1998 || Woomera || F. B. Zoltowski || FLO || align=right | 4.5 km || 
|-id=519 bgcolor=#fefefe
| 12519 Pullen ||  ||  || April 21, 1998 || Socorro || LINEAR || NYS || align=right | 2.5 km || 
|-id=520 bgcolor=#FA8072
| 12520 ||  || — || April 21, 1998 || Socorro || LINEAR || — || align=right | 3.5 km || 
|-id=521 bgcolor=#fefefe
| 12521 ||  || — || April 21, 1998 || Socorro || LINEAR || NYS || align=right | 5.3 km || 
|-id=522 bgcolor=#fefefe
| 12522 Rara ||  ||  || April 21, 1998 || Socorro || LINEAR || — || align=right | 2.9 km || 
|-id=523 bgcolor=#fefefe
| 12523 ||  || — || April 21, 1998 || Socorro || LINEAR || fast? || align=right | 6.5 km || 
|-id=524 bgcolor=#fefefe
| 12524 Conscience ||  ||  || April 25, 1998 || La Silla || E. W. Elst || — || align=right | 2.6 km || 
|-id=525 bgcolor=#E9E9E9
| 12525 ||  || — || April 23, 1998 || Socorro || LINEAR || — || align=right | 4.9 km || 
|-id=526 bgcolor=#fefefe
| 12526 de Coninck ||  ||  || April 25, 1998 || La Silla || E. W. Elst || — || align=right | 2.3 km || 
|-id=527 bgcolor=#fefefe
| 12527 Anneraugh ||  ||  || May 1, 1998 || Anderson Mesa || LONEOS || — || align=right | 6.3 km || 
|-id=528 bgcolor=#E9E9E9
| 12528 ||  || — || May 22, 1998 || Socorro || LINEAR || EUN || align=right | 6.7 km || 
|-id=529 bgcolor=#fefefe
| 12529 Reighard ||  ||  || May 22, 1998 || Socorro || LINEAR || — || align=right | 2.3 km || 
|-id=530 bgcolor=#E9E9E9
| 12530 Richardson ||  ||  || May 22, 1998 || Socorro || LINEAR || — || align=right | 8.2 km || 
|-id=531 bgcolor=#d6d6d6
| 12531 ||  || — || May 23, 1998 || Socorro || LINEAR || EOS || align=right | 9.0 km || 
|-id=532 bgcolor=#d6d6d6
| 12532 ||  || — || May 23, 1998 || Socorro || LINEAR || TIR || align=right | 6.9 km || 
|-id=533 bgcolor=#E9E9E9
| 12533 Edmond || 1998 LA ||  || June 2, 1998 || Zeno || T. Stafford || — || align=right | 3.2 km || 
|-id=534 bgcolor=#E9E9E9
| 12534 Janhoet ||  ||  || June 1, 1998 || La Silla || E. W. Elst || — || align=right | 4.9 km || 
|-id=535 bgcolor=#E9E9E9
| 12535 ||  || — || June 24, 1998 || Socorro || LINEAR || — || align=right | 11 km || 
|-id=536 bgcolor=#d6d6d6
| 12536 ||  || — || June 24, 1998 || Socorro || LINEAR || — || align=right | 8.7 km || 
|-id=537 bgcolor=#fefefe
| 12537 Kendriddle ||  ||  || June 24, 1998 || Socorro || LINEAR || FLO || align=right | 4.7 km || 
|-id=538 bgcolor=#FFC2E0
| 12538 || 1998 OH || — || July 19, 1998 || Haleakalā || NEAT || APO +1kmPHA || align=right | 1.7 km || 
|-id=539 bgcolor=#E9E9E9
| 12539 Chaikin ||  ||  || July 16, 1998 || Kitt Peak || Spacewatch || NEM || align=right | 8.6 km || 
|-id=540 bgcolor=#d6d6d6
| 12540 Picander ||  ||  || July 26, 1998 || La Silla || E. W. Elst || KOR || align=right | 7.2 km || 
|-id=541 bgcolor=#d6d6d6
| 12541 Makarska ||  ||  || August 15, 1998 || Višnjan Observatory || Višnjan Obs. || — || align=right | 7.9 km || 
|-id=542 bgcolor=#d6d6d6
| 12542 Laver ||  ||  || August 10, 1998 || Reedy Creek || J. Broughton || HYG || align=right | 9.3 km || 
|-id=543 bgcolor=#fefefe
| 12543 ||  || — || August 23, 1998 || Woomera || F. B. Zoltowski || — || align=right | 5.0 km || 
|-id=544 bgcolor=#d6d6d6
| 12544 ||  || — || August 17, 1998 || Socorro || LINEAR || — || align=right | 11 km || 
|-id=545 bgcolor=#E9E9E9
| 12545 ||  || — || August 17, 1998 || Socorro || LINEAR || — || align=right | 4.9 km || 
|-id=546 bgcolor=#d6d6d6
| 12546 ||  || — || August 17, 1998 || Socorro || LINEAR || THM || align=right | 12 km || 
|-id=547 bgcolor=#d6d6d6
| 12547 ||  || — || August 17, 1998 || Socorro || LINEAR || — || align=right | 8.4 km || 
|-id=548 bgcolor=#fefefe
| 12548 Erinriley ||  ||  || August 17, 1998 || Socorro || LINEAR || NYS || align=right | 3.3 km || 
|-id=549 bgcolor=#d6d6d6
| 12549 ||  || — || August 17, 1998 || Socorro || LINEAR || HYG || align=right | 11 km || 
|-id=550 bgcolor=#E9E9E9
| 12550 ||  || — || August 17, 1998 || Socorro || LINEAR || EUN || align=right | 6.6 km || 
|-id=551 bgcolor=#fefefe
| 12551 ||  || — || August 17, 1998 || Socorro || LINEAR || — || align=right | 7.0 km || 
|-id=552 bgcolor=#d6d6d6
| 12552 ||  || — || August 17, 1998 || Socorro || LINEAR || — || align=right | 19 km || 
|-id=553 bgcolor=#fefefe
| 12553 Aaronritter ||  ||  || August 17, 1998 || Socorro || LINEAR || — || align=right | 3.1 km || 
|-id=554 bgcolor=#d6d6d6
| 12554 ||  || — || August 17, 1998 || Socorro || LINEAR || HYG || align=right | 13 km || 
|-id=555 bgcolor=#d6d6d6
| 12555 ||  || — || August 17, 1998 || Socorro || LINEAR || KOR || align=right | 9.1 km || 
|-id=556 bgcolor=#fefefe
| 12556 Kyrobinson ||  ||  || August 17, 1998 || Socorro || LINEAR || V || align=right | 2.9 km || 
|-id=557 bgcolor=#d6d6d6
| 12557 Caracol ||  ||  || August 27, 1998 || Anderson Mesa || LONEOS || — || align=right | 15 km || 
|-id=558 bgcolor=#E9E9E9
| 12558 ||  || — || August 31, 1998 || Xinglong || SCAP || — || align=right | 5.3 km || 
|-id=559 bgcolor=#d6d6d6
| 12559 ||  || — || August 24, 1998 || Socorro || LINEAR || — || align=right | 30 km || 
|-id=560 bgcolor=#d6d6d6
| 12560 ||  || — || September 14, 1998 || Socorro || LINEAR || THM || align=right | 16 km || 
|-id=561 bgcolor=#d6d6d6
| 12561 Howard ||  ||  || September 20, 1998 || Kitt Peak || Spacewatch || THM || align=right | 14 km || 
|-id=562 bgcolor=#d6d6d6
| 12562 Briangrazer ||  ||  || September 19, 1998 || Kitt Peak || Spacewatch || — || align=right | 25 km || 
|-id=563 bgcolor=#E9E9E9
| 12563 ||  || — || September 20, 1998 || Xinglong || SCAP || — || align=right | 7.4 km || 
|-id=564 bgcolor=#d6d6d6
| 12564 Ikeller ||  ||  || September 22, 1998 || Bergisch Gladbach || W. Bickel || KOR || align=right | 5.4 km || 
|-id=565 bgcolor=#d6d6d6
| 12565 Khege ||  ||  || September 16, 1998 || Anderson Mesa || LONEOS || — || align=right | 14 km || 
|-id=566 bgcolor=#d6d6d6
| 12566 Derichardson ||  ||  || September 16, 1998 || Anderson Mesa || LONEOS || HYG || align=right | 11 km || 
|-id=567 bgcolor=#d6d6d6
| 12567 Herreweghe ||  ||  || September 21, 1998 || La Silla || E. W. Elst || THM || align=right | 12 km || 
|-id=568 bgcolor=#d6d6d6
| 12568 Kuffner ||  ||  || November 11, 1998 || Višnjan Observatory || K. Korlević || — || align=right | 6.6 km || 
|-id=569 bgcolor=#d6d6d6
| 12569 ||  || — || November 10, 1998 || Socorro || LINEAR || — || align=right | 16 km || 
|-id=570 bgcolor=#d6d6d6
| 12570 ||  || — || November 18, 1998 || Nachi-Katsuura || Y. Shimizu, T. Urata || — || align=right | 15 km || 
|-id=571 bgcolor=#E9E9E9
| 12571 ||  || — || July 12, 1999 || Socorro || LINEAR || — || align=right | 3.4 km || 
|-id=572 bgcolor=#fefefe
| 12572 Sadegh ||  ||  || July 13, 1999 || Socorro || LINEAR || FLO || align=right | 3.0 km || 
|-id=573 bgcolor=#d6d6d6
| 12573 ||  || — || July 12, 1999 || Socorro || LINEAR || SAN || align=right | 6.5 km || 
|-id=574 bgcolor=#E9E9E9
| 12574 LONEOS || 1999 RT ||  || September 4, 1999 || Fountain Hills || C. W. Juels || — || align=right | 7.4 km || 
|-id=575 bgcolor=#fefefe
| 12575 Palmaria ||  ||  || September 4, 1999 || Monte Viseggi || P. Pietrapriana, L. Sannino || — || align=right | 3.1 km || 
|-id=576 bgcolor=#E9E9E9
| 12576 Oresme ||  ||  || September 5, 1999 || Prescott || P. G. Comba || — || align=right | 5.0 km || 
|-id=577 bgcolor=#E9E9E9
| 12577 Samra ||  ||  || September 7, 1999 || Socorro || LINEAR || slow || align=right | 6.5 km || 
|-id=578 bgcolor=#fefefe
| 12578 Bensaur ||  ||  || September 7, 1999 || Socorro || LINEAR || V || align=right | 2.2 km || 
|-id=579 bgcolor=#d6d6d6
| 12579 Ceva ||  ||  || September 5, 1999 || Bologna || San Vittore Obs. || — || align=right | 6.6 km || 
|-id=580 bgcolor=#d6d6d6
| 12580 Antonini ||  ||  || September 8, 1999 || Saint-Michel-sur-Meurthe || L. Bernasconi || — || align=right | 7.9 km || 
|-id=581 bgcolor=#fefefe
| 12581 Rovinj ||  ||  || September 8, 1999 || Višnjan Observatory || Višnjan Obs. || NYS || align=right | 2.4 km || 
|-id=582 bgcolor=#fefefe
| 12582 ||  || — || September 11, 1999 || Višnjan Observatory || Višnjan Obs. || — || align=right | 5.1 km || 
|-id=583 bgcolor=#d6d6d6
| 12583 Buckjean ||  ||  || September 11, 1999 || High Point || D. K. Chesney || — || align=right | 26 km || 
|-id=584 bgcolor=#fefefe
| 12584 Zeljkoandreic ||  ||  || September 12, 1999 || Višnjan Observatory || K. Korlević || V || align=right | 2.6 km || 
|-id=585 bgcolor=#E9E9E9
| 12585 Katschwarz ||  ||  || September 7, 1999 || Socorro || LINEAR || — || align=right | 3.3 km || 
|-id=586 bgcolor=#E9E9E9
| 12586 ||  || — || September 7, 1999 || Socorro || LINEAR || — || align=right | 5.6 km || 
|-id=587 bgcolor=#E9E9E9
| 12587 ||  || — || September 7, 1999 || Socorro || LINEAR || — || align=right | 6.7 km || 
|-id=588 bgcolor=#fefefe
| 12588 ||  || — || September 7, 1999 || Socorro || LINEAR || — || align=right | 5.5 km || 
|-id=589 bgcolor=#fefefe
| 12589 ||  || — || September 9, 1999 || Socorro || LINEAR || — || align=right | 2.6 km || 
|-id=590 bgcolor=#E9E9E9
| 12590 ||  || — || September 9, 1999 || Socorro || LINEAR || — || align=right | 4.3 km || 
|-id=591 bgcolor=#fefefe
| 12591 ||  || — || September 9, 1999 || Socorro || LINEAR || V || align=right | 3.9 km || 
|-id=592 bgcolor=#E9E9E9
| 12592 ||  || — || September 9, 1999 || Socorro || LINEAR || — || align=right | 4.6 km || 
|-id=593 bgcolor=#fefefe
| 12593 Shashlov ||  ||  || September 9, 1999 || Socorro || LINEAR || — || align=right | 3.0 km || 
|-id=594 bgcolor=#E9E9E9
| 12594 ||  || — || September 9, 1999 || Socorro || LINEAR || — || align=right | 7.5 km || 
|-id=595 bgcolor=#fefefe
| 12595 Amandashaw ||  ||  || September 9, 1999 || Socorro || LINEAR || FLO || align=right | 4.8 km || 
|-id=596 bgcolor=#fefefe
| 12596 Shukla ||  ||  || September 9, 1999 || Socorro || LINEAR || — || align=right | 3.4 km || 
|-id=597 bgcolor=#d6d6d6
| 12597 ||  || — || September 9, 1999 || Socorro || LINEAR || KOR || align=right | 5.7 km || 
|-id=598 bgcolor=#E9E9E9
| 12598 Sierra ||  ||  || September 9, 1999 || Socorro || LINEAR || GEF || align=right | 4.7 km || 
|-id=599 bgcolor=#fefefe
| 12599 Singhal ||  ||  || September 9, 1999 || Socorro || LINEAR || — || align=right | 3.0 km || 
|-id=600 bgcolor=#d6d6d6
| 12600 ||  || — || September 9, 1999 || Socorro || LINEAR || — || align=right | 14 km || 
|}

12601–12700 

|-bgcolor=#fefefe
| 12601 Tiffanyswann ||  ||  || September 9, 1999 || Socorro || LINEAR || NYS || align=right | 6.0 km || 
|-id=602 bgcolor=#fefefe
| 12602 Tammytam ||  ||  || September 9, 1999 || Socorro || LINEAR || V || align=right | 2.8 km || 
|-id=603 bgcolor=#fefefe
| 12603 Tanchunghee ||  ||  || September 9, 1999 || Socorro || LINEAR || NYS || align=right | 2.4 km || 
|-id=604 bgcolor=#fefefe
| 12604 Lisatate ||  ||  || September 7, 1999 || Socorro || LINEAR || — || align=right | 2.5 km || 
|-id=605 bgcolor=#E9E9E9
| 12605 || 1999 SK || — || September 17, 1999 || Višnjan Observatory || Višnjan Obs. || — || align=right | 3.0 km || 
|-id=606 bgcolor=#fefefe
| 12606 Apuleius || 2043 P-L ||  || September 24, 1960 || Palomar || PLS || — || align=right | 2.3 km || 
|-id=607 bgcolor=#E9E9E9
| 12607 Alcaeus || 2058 P-L ||  || September 24, 1960 || Palomar || PLS || — || align=right | 5.9 km || 
|-id=608 bgcolor=#fefefe
| 12608 Aesop || 2091 P-L ||  || September 24, 1960 || Palomar || PLS || — || align=right | 2.5 km || 
|-id=609 bgcolor=#d6d6d6
| 12609 Apollodoros || 2155 P-L ||  || September 24, 1960 || Palomar || PLS || THM || align=right | 8.9 km || 
|-id=610 bgcolor=#d6d6d6
| 12610 Hãfez || 2551 P-L ||  || September 24, 1960 || Palomar || PLS || — || align=right | 5.1 km || 
|-id=611 bgcolor=#d6d6d6
| 12611 Ingres || 2555 P-L ||  || September 24, 1960 || Palomar || PLS || — || align=right | 7.0 km || 
|-id=612 bgcolor=#fefefe
| 12612 Daumier || 2592 P-L ||  || September 24, 1960 || Palomar || PLS || — || align=right | 3.4 km || 
|-id=613 bgcolor=#E9E9E9
| 12613 Hogarth || 4024 P-L ||  || September 24, 1960 || Palomar || PLS || — || align=right | 7.8 km || 
|-id=614 bgcolor=#fefefe
| 12614 Hokusai || 4119 P-L ||  || September 24, 1960 || Palomar || PLS || FLO || align=right | 2.9 km || 
|-id=615 bgcolor=#d6d6d6
| 12615 Mendesdeleon || 4626 P-L ||  || September 24, 1960 || Palomar || PLS || KOR || align=right | 4.7 km || 
|-id=616 bgcolor=#E9E9E9
| 12616 Lochner || 4874 P-L ||  || September 26, 1960 || Palomar || PLS || — || align=right | 4.6 km || 
|-id=617 bgcolor=#E9E9E9
| 12617 Angelusilesius || 5568 P-L ||  || October 17, 1960 || Palomar || PLS || — || align=right | 11 km || 
|-id=618 bgcolor=#d6d6d6
| 12618 Cellarius || 6217 P-L ||  || September 24, 1960 || Palomar || PLS || — || align=right | 11 km || 
|-id=619 bgcolor=#fefefe
| 12619 Anubelshunu || 6242 P-L ||  || September 24, 1960 || Palomar || PLS || V || align=right | 2.9 km || 
|-id=620 bgcolor=#d6d6d6
| 12620 Simaqian || 6335 P-L ||  || September 24, 1960 || Palomar || PLS || THM || align=right | 8.7 km || 
|-id=621 bgcolor=#d6d6d6
| 12621 Alsufi || 6585 P-L ||  || September 24, 1960 || Palomar || PLS || — || align=right | 9.3 km || 
|-id=622 bgcolor=#E9E9E9
| 12622 Doppelmayr || 6614 P-L ||  || September 24, 1960 || Palomar || PLS || — || align=right | 3.1 km || 
|-id=623 bgcolor=#fefefe
| 12623 Tawaddud || 9544 P-L ||  || October 17, 1960 || Palomar || PLS || — || align=right | 3.6 km || 
|-id=624 bgcolor=#fefefe
| 12624 Mariacunitia || 9565 P-L ||  || October 17, 1960 || Palomar || PLS || — || align=right | 3.4 km || 
|-id=625 bgcolor=#d6d6d6
| 12625 Koopman || 9578 P-L ||  || October 17, 1960 || Palomar || PLS || — || align=right | 14 km || 
|-id=626 bgcolor=#E9E9E9
| 12626 Timmerman || 1116 T-1 ||  || March 25, 1971 || Palomar || PLS || — || align=right | 6.8 km || 
|-id=627 bgcolor=#fefefe
| 12627 Maryedwards || 1230 T-1 ||  || March 25, 1971 || Palomar || PLS || — || align=right | 2.1 km || 
|-id=628 bgcolor=#fefefe
| 12628 Ackworthorr || 2120 T-1 ||  || March 25, 1971 || Palomar || PLS || NYS || align=right | 5.0 km || 
|-id=629 bgcolor=#fefefe
| 12629 Jandeboer || 2168 T-1 ||  || March 25, 1971 || Palomar || PLS || — || align=right | 6.5 km || 
|-id=630 bgcolor=#fefefe
| 12630 Verstappen || 3033 T-1 ||  || March 26, 1971 || Palomar || PLS || V || align=right | 2.4 km || 
|-id=631 bgcolor=#d6d6d6
| 12631 Mariekebaan || 3051 T-1 ||  || March 26, 1971 || Palomar || PLS || — || align=right | 7.7 km || 
|-id=632 bgcolor=#fefefe
| 12632 Mignonette || 3105 T-1 ||  || March 26, 1971 || Palomar || PLS || NYS || align=right | 6.1 km || 
|-id=633 bgcolor=#fefefe
| 12633 Warmenhoven || 3119 T-1 ||  || March 26, 1971 || Palomar || PLS || NYS || align=right | 4.8 km || 
|-id=634 bgcolor=#fefefe
| 12634 LOFAR || 3178 T-1 ||  || March 26, 1971 || Palomar || PLS || NYS || align=right | 1.9 km || 
|-id=635 bgcolor=#d6d6d6
| 12635 Hennylamers || 4220 T-1 ||  || March 26, 1971 || Palomar || PLS || EOS || align=right | 6.5 km || 
|-id=636 bgcolor=#d6d6d6
| 12636 Padrielli || 4854 T-1 ||  || May 13, 1971 || Palomar || PLS || EOS || align=right | 8.0 km || 
|-id=637 bgcolor=#E9E9E9
| 12637 Gustavleonhardt || 1053 T-2 ||  || September 29, 1973 || Palomar || PLS || — || align=right | 7.3 km || 
|-id=638 bgcolor=#fefefe
| 12638 Fransbrüggen || 1063 T-2 ||  || September 29, 1973 || Palomar || PLS || NYS || align=right | 2.3 km || 
|-id=639 bgcolor=#E9E9E9
| 12639 Tonkoopman || 1105 T-2 ||  || September 29, 1973 || Palomar || PLS || — || align=right | 5.6 km || 
|-id=640 bgcolor=#d6d6d6
| 12640 Reinbertdeleeuw || 1231 T-2 ||  || September 29, 1973 || Palomar || PLS || KOR || align=right | 5.1 km || 
|-id=641 bgcolor=#fefefe
| 12641 Hubertushenrichs || 1310 T-2 ||  || September 29, 1973 || Palomar || PLS || MAS || align=right | 2.2 km || 
|-id=642 bgcolor=#fefefe
| 12642 Davidjansen || 1348 T-2 ||  || September 29, 1973 || Palomar || PLS || ERI || align=right | 6.4 km || 
|-id=643 bgcolor=#d6d6d6
| 12643 Henkolthof || 3180 T-2 ||  || September 30, 1973 || Palomar || PLS || — || align=right | 4.6 km || 
|-id=644 bgcolor=#fefefe
| 12644 Robertwielinga || 3285 T-2 ||  || September 30, 1973 || Palomar || PLS || NYS || align=right | 3.3 km || 
|-id=645 bgcolor=#fefefe
| 12645 Jacobrosales || 4240 T-2 ||  || September 29, 1973 || Palomar || PLS || NYS || align=right | 2.3 km || 
|-id=646 bgcolor=#E9E9E9
| 12646 Avercamp || 5175 T-2 ||  || September 25, 1973 || Palomar || PLS || — || align=right | 6.0 km || 
|-id=647 bgcolor=#d6d6d6
| 12647 Pauluspotter || 5332 T-2 ||  || September 30, 1973 || Palomar || PLS || — || align=right | 5.8 km || 
|-id=648 bgcolor=#fefefe
| 12648 Ibarbourou || 1135 T-3 ||  || October 17, 1977 || Palomar || PLS || V || align=right | 3.4 km || 
|-id=649 bgcolor=#C2FFFF
| 12649 Ascanios || 2035 T-3 ||  || October 16, 1977 || Palomar || PLS || L5 || align=right | 25 km || 
|-id=650 bgcolor=#fefefe
| 12650 de Vries || 2247 T-3 ||  || October 16, 1977 || Palomar || PLS || ERI || align=right | 5.3 km || 
|-id=651 bgcolor=#d6d6d6
| 12651 Frenkel || 2268 T-3 ||  || October 16, 1977 || Palomar || PLS || EOS || align=right | 6.1 km || 
|-id=652 bgcolor=#d6d6d6
| 12652 Groningen || 2622 T-3 ||  || October 16, 1977 || Palomar || PLS || — || align=right | 7.0 km || 
|-id=653 bgcolor=#fefefe
| 12653 van der Klis || 2664 T-3 ||  || October 11, 1977 || Palomar || PLS || NYS || align=right | 3.9 km || 
|-id=654 bgcolor=#d6d6d6
| 12654 Heinofalcke || 4118 T-3 ||  || October 16, 1977 || Palomar || PLS || — || align=right | 9.9 km || 
|-id=655 bgcolor=#d6d6d6
| 12655 Benferinga || 5041 T-3 ||  || October 16, 1977 || Palomar || PLS || — || align=right | 10 km || 
|-id=656 bgcolor=#E9E9E9
| 12656 Gerdebruijn || 5170 T-3 ||  || October 16, 1977 || Palomar || PLS || — || align=right | 3.2 km || 
|-id=657 bgcolor=#d6d6d6
| 12657 Bonch-Bruevich ||  ||  || August 30, 1971 || Nauchnij || T. M. Smirnova || EOS || align=right | 8.9 km || 
|-id=658 bgcolor=#C2FFFF
| 12658 Peiraios || 1973 SL ||  || September 19, 1973 || Palomar || PLS || L4 || align=right | 26 km || 
|-id=659 bgcolor=#fefefe
| 12659 Schlegel ||  ||  || October 27, 1973 || Tautenburg Observatory || F. Börngen || NYS || align=right | 2.6 km || 
|-id=660 bgcolor=#E9E9E9
| 12660 || 1975 NC || — || July 15, 1975 || Cerro El Roble || C. Torres, S. Barros || — || align=right | 4.8 km || 
|-id=661 bgcolor=#fefefe
| 12661 Schelling ||  ||  || February 27, 1976 || Tautenburg Observatory || F. Börngen || — || align=right | 3.3 km || 
|-id=662 bgcolor=#d6d6d6
| 12662 || 1978 CK || — || February 2, 1978 || Palomar || J. Gibson || ALA || align=right | 15 km || 
|-id=663 bgcolor=#d6d6d6
| 12663 Björkegren ||  ||  || September 2, 1978 || La Silla || C.-I. Lagerkvist || KOR || align=right | 5.2 km || 
|-id=664 bgcolor=#E9E9E9
| 12664 Sonisenia ||  ||  || September 27, 1978 || Nauchnij || L. I. Chernykh || — || align=right | 7.3 km || 
|-id=665 bgcolor=#fefefe
| 12665 Chriscarson ||  ||  || November 6, 1978 || Palomar || E. F. Helin, S. J. Bus || — || align=right | 2.8 km || 
|-id=666 bgcolor=#d6d6d6
| 12666 || 1978 XW || — || December 6, 1978 || Palomar || E. Bowell, A. Warnock || — || align=right | 10 km || 
|-id=667 bgcolor=#E9E9E9
| 12667 || 1979 DF || — || February 28, 1979 || Anderson Mesa || N. G. Thomas || — || align=right | 9.2 km || 
|-id=668 bgcolor=#E9E9E9
| 12668 Scottstarin ||  ||  || June 25, 1979 || Siding Spring || E. F. Helin, S. J. Bus || — || align=right | 8.0 km || 
|-id=669 bgcolor=#E9E9E9
| 12669 Emilybrisnehan ||  ||  || June 25, 1979 || Siding Spring || E. F. Helin, S. J. Bus || — || align=right | 5.7 km || 
|-id=670 bgcolor=#fefefe
| 12670 Passargea ||  ||  || September 22, 1979 || Nauchnij || N. S. Chernykh || — || align=right | 2.1 km || 
|-id=671 bgcolor=#fefefe
| 12671 Thörnqvist || 1980 FU ||  || March 16, 1980 || La Silla || C.-I. Lagerkvist || — || align=right | 4.2 km || 
|-id=672 bgcolor=#d6d6d6
| 12672 Nygårdh ||  ||  || March 16, 1980 || La Silla || C.-I. Lagerkvist || — || align=right | 5.1 km || 
|-id=673 bgcolor=#d6d6d6
| 12673 Kiselman ||  ||  || March 16, 1980 || La Silla || C.-I. Lagerkvist || — || align=right | 7.8 km || 
|-id=674 bgcolor=#fefefe
| 12674 Rybalka ||  ||  || September 7, 1980 || Nauchnij || N. S. Chernykh || NYS || align=right | 3.7 km || 
|-id=675 bgcolor=#fefefe
| 12675 Chabot ||  ||  || October 9, 1980 || Palomar || C. S. Shoemaker, E. M. Shoemaker || — || align=right | 5.3 km || 
|-id=676 bgcolor=#d6d6d6
| 12676 Dianemerline ||  ||  || February 28, 1981 || Siding Spring || S. J. Bus || — || align=right | 4.2 km || 
|-id=677 bgcolor=#d6d6d6
| 12677 Gritsavage ||  ||  || March 2, 1981 || Siding Spring || S. J. Bus || EOS || align=right | 4.7 km || 
|-id=678 bgcolor=#E9E9E9
| 12678 Gerhardus ||  ||  || March 2, 1981 || Siding Spring || S. J. Bus || — || align=right | 2.8 km || 
|-id=679 bgcolor=#d6d6d6
| 12679 Jamessimpson ||  ||  || March 2, 1981 || Siding Spring || S. J. Bus || — || align=right | 4.7 km || 
|-id=680 bgcolor=#fefefe
| 12680 Bogdanovich ||  ||  || May 6, 1981 || Palomar || C. S. Shoemaker || — || align=right | 2.3 km || 
|-id=681 bgcolor=#E9E9E9
| 12681 Pevear ||  ||  || October 24, 1981 || Palomar || S. J. Bus || — || align=right | 6.8 km || 
|-id=682 bgcolor=#E9E9E9
| 12682 Kawada ||  ||  || November 14, 1982 || Kiso || H. Kosai, K. Furukawa || — || align=right | 3.5 km || 
|-id=683 bgcolor=#fefefe
| 12683 ||  || — || September 2, 1983 || La Silla || H. Debehogne || — || align=right | 4.4 km || 
|-id=684 bgcolor=#E9E9E9
| 12684 || 1984 DQ || — || February 23, 1984 || La Silla || H. Debehogne || MIT || align=right | 9.3 km || 
|-id=685 bgcolor=#fefefe
| 12685 || 1985 VE || — || November 14, 1985 || Brorfelde || P. Jensen || FLO || align=right | 4.4 km || 
|-id=686 bgcolor=#E9E9E9
| 12686 Bezuglyj ||  ||  || October 3, 1986 || Nauchnij || L. G. Karachkina || EUN || align=right | 5.7 km || 
|-id=687 bgcolor=#E9E9E9
| 12687 de Valory ||  ||  || December 17, 1987 || La Silla || E. W. Elst, G. Pizarro || — || align=right | 6.6 km || 
|-id=688 bgcolor=#E9E9E9
| 12688 Baekeland ||  ||  || February 13, 1988 || La Silla || E. W. Elst || EUN || align=right | 5.3 km || 
|-id=689 bgcolor=#d6d6d6
| 12689 ||  || — || September 8, 1988 || Brorfelde || P. Jensen || EOS || align=right | 7.8 km || 
|-id=690 bgcolor=#d6d6d6
| 12690 Kochimiraikagaku ||  ||  || November 5, 1988 || Geisei || T. Seki || — || align=right | 15 km || 
|-id=691 bgcolor=#fefefe
| 12691 ||  || — || November 7, 1988 || Yatsugatake || Y. Kushida, M. Inoue || — || align=right | 7.4 km || 
|-id=692 bgcolor=#fefefe
| 12692 ||  || — || January 29, 1989 || Kleť || A. Mrkos || NYS || align=right | 2.8 km || 
|-id=693 bgcolor=#E9E9E9
| 12693 || 1989 EZ || — || March 9, 1989 || Gekko || Y. Oshima || — || align=right | 8.1 km || 
|-id=694 bgcolor=#d6d6d6
| 12694 Schleiermacher ||  ||  || March 7, 1989 || Tautenburg Observatory || F. Börngen || THM || align=right | 8.5 km || 
|-id=695 bgcolor=#E9E9E9
| 12695 Utrecht ||  ||  || April 1, 1989 || La Silla || E. W. Elst || — || align=right | 3.8 km || 
|-id=696 bgcolor=#E9E9E9
| 12696 Camus ||  ||  || September 26, 1989 || La Silla || E. W. Elst || — || align=right | 9.3 km || 
|-id=697 bgcolor=#E9E9E9
| 12697 Verhaeren ||  ||  || September 26, 1989 || La Silla || E. W. Elst || DOR || align=right | 14 km || 
|-id=698 bgcolor=#E9E9E9
| 12698 ||  || — || October 22, 1989 || Kleť || A. Mrkos || — || align=right | 5.6 km || 
|-id=699 bgcolor=#fefefe
| 12699 ||  || — || February 24, 1990 || La Silla || H. Debehogne || — || align=right | 5.0 km || 
|-id=700 bgcolor=#fefefe
| 12700 || 1990 FH || — || March 23, 1990 || Palomar || E. F. Helin || PHO || align=right | 3.7 km || 
|}

12701–12800 

|-bgcolor=#fefefe
| 12701 Chénier || 1990 GE ||  || April 15, 1990 || La Silla || E. W. Elst || — || align=right | 3.6 km || 
|-id=702 bgcolor=#E9E9E9
| 12702 Panamarenko ||  ||  || September 22, 1990 || La Silla || E. W. Elst || — || align=right | 4.4 km || 
|-id=703 bgcolor=#E9E9E9
| 12703 ||  || — || September 23, 1990 || La Silla || H. Debehogne || — || align=right | 4.8 km || 
|-id=704 bgcolor=#E9E9E9
| 12704 Tupolev ||  ||  || September 24, 1990 || Nauchnij || L. V. Zhuravleva, G. R. Kastelʹ || — || align=right | 6.0 km || 
|-id=705 bgcolor=#E9E9E9
| 12705 || 1990 TJ || — || October 12, 1990 || Siding Spring || R. H. McNaught || — || align=right | 5.5 km || 
|-id=706 bgcolor=#E9E9E9
| 12706 Tanezaki ||  ||  || October 15, 1990 || Geisei || T. Seki || IAN || align=right | 3.5 km || 
|-id=707 bgcolor=#E9E9E9
| 12707 || 1990 UK || — || October 20, 1990 || Oohira || T. Urata || MAR || align=right | 5.7 km || 
|-id=708 bgcolor=#E9E9E9
| 12708 Van Straten ||  ||  || October 16, 1990 || La Silla || E. W. Elst || — || align=right | 4.7 km || 
|-id=709 bgcolor=#E9E9E9
| 12709 Bergen op Zoom ||  ||  || November 15, 1990 || La Silla || E. W. Elst || EUN || align=right | 5.6 km || 
|-id=710 bgcolor=#E9E9E9
| 12710 Breda ||  ||  || November 15, 1990 || La Silla || E. W. Elst || — || align=right | 4.6 km || 
|-id=711 bgcolor=#FFC2E0
| 12711 Tukmit || 1991 BB ||  || January 19, 1991 || Palomar || J. E. Mueller || APO +1km || align=right | 2.3 km || 
|-id=712 bgcolor=#d6d6d6
| 12712 ||  || — || March 12, 1991 || La Silla || H. Debehogne || — || align=right | 12 km || 
|-id=713 bgcolor=#d6d6d6
| 12713 ||  || — || March 22, 1991 || La Silla || H. Debehogne || — || align=right | 12 km || 
|-id=714 bgcolor=#C2FFFF
| 12714 Alkimos ||  ||  || April 15, 1991 || Palomar || C. S. Shoemaker, E. M. Shoemaker || L4 || align=right | 48 km || 
|-id=715 bgcolor=#fefefe
| 12715 Godin ||  ||  || April 8, 1991 || La Silla || E. W. Elst || — || align=right | 4.5 km || 
|-id=716 bgcolor=#d6d6d6
| 12716 Delft ||  ||  || April 8, 1991 || La Silla || E. W. Elst || — || align=right | 10 km || 
|-id=717 bgcolor=#fefefe
| 12717 || 1991 HK || — || April 16, 1991 || Dynic || A. Sugie || — || align=right | 2.8 km || 
|-id=718 bgcolor=#fefefe
| 12718 Le Gentil ||  ||  || June 6, 1991 || La Silla || E. W. Elst || FLO || align=right | 3.6 km || 
|-id=719 bgcolor=#fefefe
| 12719 Pingré ||  ||  || June 6, 1991 || La Silla || E. W. Elst || — || align=right | 3.6 km || 
|-id=720 bgcolor=#fefefe
| 12720 ||  || — || July 6, 1991 || La Silla || H. Debehogne || — || align=right | 4.6 km || 
|-id=721 bgcolor=#fefefe
| 12721 || 1991 PB || — || August 3, 1991 || Kiyosato || S. Otomo || NYS || align=right | 4.2 km || 
|-id=722 bgcolor=#fefefe
| 12722 Petrarca ||  ||  || August 10, 1991 || La Silla || E. W. Elst || — || align=right | 4.4 km || 
|-id=723 bgcolor=#fefefe
| 12723 ||  || — || August 7, 1991 || Palomar || H. E. Holt || — || align=right | 4.8 km || 
|-id=724 bgcolor=#E9E9E9
| 12724 ||  || — || August 6, 1991 || Palomar || H. E. Holt || — || align=right | 5.6 km || 
|-id=725 bgcolor=#fefefe
| 12725 ||  || — || August 7, 1991 || Palomar || H. E. Holt || — || align=right | 5.0 km || 
|-id=726 bgcolor=#fefefe
| 12726 ||  || — || August 7, 1991 || Palomar || H. E. Holt || — || align=right | 5.0 km || 
|-id=727 bgcolor=#fefefe
| 12727 Cavendish ||  ||  || August 14, 1991 || La Silla || E. W. Elst || — || align=right | 4.1 km || 
|-id=728 bgcolor=#E9E9E9
| 12728 ||  || — || September 10, 1991 || Dynic || A. Sugie || MAR || align=right | 5.9 km || 
|-id=729 bgcolor=#fefefe
| 12729 Berger ||  ||  || September 13, 1991 || Tautenburg Observatory || F. Börngen, L. D. Schmadel || — || align=right | 5.2 km || 
|-id=730 bgcolor=#fefefe
| 12730 ||  || — || September 11, 1991 || Palomar || H. E. Holt || NYS || align=right | 3.0 km || 
|-id=731 bgcolor=#fefefe
| 12731 ||  || — || September 10, 1991 || Palomar || H. E. Holt || — || align=right | 4.9 km || 
|-id=732 bgcolor=#fefefe
| 12732 || 1991 TN || — || October 1, 1991 || Siding Spring || R. H. McNaught || — || align=right | 4.4 km || 
|-id=733 bgcolor=#E9E9E9
| 12733 ||  || — || October 13, 1991 || Kiyosato || S. Otomo || — || align=right | 6.7 km || 
|-id=734 bgcolor=#fefefe
| 12734 Haruna ||  ||  || October 29, 1991 || Kitami || A. Takahashi, K. Watanabe || — || align=right | 4.0 km || 
|-id=735 bgcolor=#fefefe
| 12735 ||  || — || November 4, 1991 || Yatsugatake || Y. Kushida, O. Muramatsu || — || align=right | 5.0 km || 
|-id=736 bgcolor=#fefefe
| 12736 ||  || — || November 13, 1991 || Kiyosato || S. Otomo || PHO || align=right | 3.6 km || 
|-id=737 bgcolor=#fefefe
| 12737 ||  || — || November 10, 1991 || Kiyosato || S. Otomo || V || align=right | 4.1 km || 
|-id=738 bgcolor=#E9E9E9
| 12738 Satoshimiki || 1992 AL ||  || January 4, 1992 || Okutama || T. Hioki, S. Hayakawa || — || align=right | 12 km || 
|-id=739 bgcolor=#E9E9E9
| 12739 ||  || — || February 29, 1992 || La Silla || UESAC || HEN || align=right | 4.1 km || 
|-id=740 bgcolor=#E9E9E9
| 12740 ||  || — || March 2, 1992 || La Silla || UESAC || MAR || align=right | 9.3 km || 
|-id=741 bgcolor=#E9E9E9
| 12741 ||  || — || March 1, 1992 || La Silla || UESAC || — || align=right | 4.1 km || 
|-id=742 bgcolor=#d6d6d6
| 12742 Delisle ||  ||  || July 26, 1992 || Caussols || E. W. Elst || — || align=right | 25 km || 
|-id=743 bgcolor=#d6d6d6
| 12743 ||  || — || August 2, 1992 || Palomar || H. E. Holt || ALA || align=right | 16 km || 
|-id=744 bgcolor=#fefefe
| 12744 || 1992 SQ || — || September 26, 1992 || Dynic || A. Sugie || — || align=right | 2.9 km || 
|-id=745 bgcolor=#fefefe
| 12745 ||  || — || October 21, 1992 || Kani || Y. Mizuno, T. Furuta || — || align=right | 3.4 km || 
|-id=746 bgcolor=#fefefe
| 12746 Yumeginga ||  ||  || November 16, 1992 || Kitami || M. Yanai, K. Watanabe || FLO || align=right | 4.5 km || 
|-id=747 bgcolor=#fefefe
| 12747 Michageffert ||  ||  || December 18, 1992 || Caussols || E. W. Elst || — || align=right | 3.2 km || 
|-id=748 bgcolor=#fefefe
| 12748 ||  || — || January 30, 1993 || Yakiimo || A. Natori, T. Urata || PHO || align=right | 4.2 km || 
|-id=749 bgcolor=#fefefe
| 12749 Odokaigan || 1993 CB ||  || February 2, 1993 || Geisei || T. Seki || FLO || align=right | 3.3 km || 
|-id=750 bgcolor=#E9E9E9
| 12750 Berthollet ||  ||  || February 18, 1993 || Haute-Provence || E. W. Elst || — || align=right | 6.6 km || 
|-id=751 bgcolor=#fefefe
| 12751 Kamihayashi || 1993 EU ||  || March 15, 1993 || Kitami || K. Endate, K. Watanabe || NYS || align=right | 3.7 km || 
|-id=752 bgcolor=#fefefe
| 12752 Kvarnis ||  ||  || March 19, 1993 || La Silla || UESAC || NYS || align=right | 5.1 km || 
|-id=753 bgcolor=#E9E9E9
| 12753 Povenmire || 1993 HE ||  || April 18, 1993 || Palomar || C. S. Shoemaker, E. M. Shoemaker || — || align=right | 7.6 km || 
|-id=754 bgcolor=#E9E9E9
| 12754 ||  || — || June 15, 1993 || Palomar || H. E. Holt || GEF || align=right | 6.9 km || 
|-id=755 bgcolor=#E9E9E9
| 12755 Balmer ||  ||  || July 20, 1993 || La Silla || E. W. Elst || PAD || align=right | 9.4 km || 
|-id=756 bgcolor=#E9E9E9
| 12756 ||  || — || August 19, 1993 || Palomar || E. F. Helin || EUN || align=right | 6.6 km || 
|-id=757 bgcolor=#d6d6d6
| 12757 Yangtze ||  ||  || September 14, 1993 || La Silla || H. Debehogne, E. W. Elst || KOR || align=right | 5.4 km || 
|-id=758 bgcolor=#d6d6d6
| 12758 Kabudari ||  ||  || September 22, 1993 || Mérida || O. A. Naranjo || THM || align=right | 8.3 km || 
|-id=759 bgcolor=#d6d6d6
| 12759 Joule ||  ||  || October 9, 1993 || La Silla || E. W. Elst || HYG || align=right | 13 km || 
|-id=760 bgcolor=#d6d6d6
| 12760 Maxwell ||  ||  || October 9, 1993 || La Silla || E. W. Elst || EOS || align=right | 6.9 km || 
|-id=761 bgcolor=#d6d6d6
| 12761 Pauwels ||  ||  || October 9, 1993 || La Silla || E. W. Elst || — || align=right | 10 km || 
|-id=762 bgcolor=#d6d6d6
| 12762 Nadiavittor ||  ||  || October 26, 1993 || Farra d'Isonzo || Farra d'Isonzo || — || align=right | 5.5 km || 
|-id=763 bgcolor=#d6d6d6
| 12763 ||  || — || October 19, 1993 || Palomar || E. F. Helin || EOS || align=right | 8.6 km || 
|-id=764 bgcolor=#d6d6d6
| 12764 ||  || — || November 11, 1993 || Kushiro || S. Ueda, H. Kaneda || — || align=right | 19 km || 
|-id=765 bgcolor=#d6d6d6
| 12765 ||  || — || November 11, 1993 || Kushiro || S. Ueda, H. Kaneda || — || align=right | 10 km || 
|-id=766 bgcolor=#d6d6d6
| 12766 Paschen ||  ||  || November 9, 1993 || Caussols || E. W. Elst || — || align=right | 10 km || 
|-id=767 bgcolor=#d6d6d6
| 12767 || 1994 AS || — || January 4, 1994 || Ōizumi || T. Kobayashi || — || align=right | 12 km || 
|-id=768 bgcolor=#fefefe
| 12768 ||  || — || March 10, 1994 || Ōizumi || T. Kobayashi || — || align=right | 3.9 km || 
|-id=769 bgcolor=#fefefe
| 12769 Kandakurenai || 1994 FF ||  || March 18, 1994 || Kitami || K. Endate, K. Watanabe || — || align=right | 4.2 km || 
|-id=770 bgcolor=#fefefe
| 12770 || 1994 GF || — || April 3, 1994 || Ōizumi || T. Kobayashi || — || align=right | 2.7 km || 
|-id=771 bgcolor=#fefefe
| 12771 Kimshin ||  ||  || April 5, 1994 || Kitami || K. Endate, K. Watanabe || FLO || align=right | 4.2 km || 
|-id=772 bgcolor=#fefefe
| 12772 ||  || — || April 14, 1994 || Ōizumi || T. Kobayashi || — || align=right | 4.2 km || 
|-id=773 bgcolor=#E9E9E9
| 12773 Lyman ||  ||  || August 10, 1994 || La Silla || E. W. Elst || HEN || align=right | 3.7 km || 
|-id=774 bgcolor=#E9E9E9
| 12774 Pfund ||  ||  || August 12, 1994 || La Silla || E. W. Elst || MIS || align=right | 5.4 km || 
|-id=775 bgcolor=#E9E9E9
| 12775 Brackett ||  ||  || August 12, 1994 || La Silla || E. W. Elst || — || align=right | 4.3 km || 
|-id=776 bgcolor=#E9E9E9
| 12776 Reynolds ||  ||  || August 12, 1994 || La Silla || E. W. Elst || — || align=right | 3.0 km || 
|-id=777 bgcolor=#E9E9E9
| 12777 Manuel ||  ||  || August 27, 1994 || Pleiade || P. Antolini, G. Zonaro || — || align=right | 4.1 km || 
|-id=778 bgcolor=#E9E9E9
| 12778 ||  || — || November 4, 1994 || Ōizumi || T. Kobayashi || PAD || align=right | 6.8 km || 
|-id=779 bgcolor=#E9E9E9
| 12779 ||  || — || December 28, 1994 || Ōizumi || T. Kobayashi || — || align=right | 9.7 km || 
|-id=780 bgcolor=#d6d6d6
| 12780 Salamony ||  ||  || February 9, 1995 || Sudbury || D. di Cicco || — || align=right | 9.5 km || 
|-id=781 bgcolor=#d6d6d6
| 12781 ||  || — || March 12, 1995 || Ondřejov || L. Kotková || — || align=right | 6.7 km || 
|-id=782 bgcolor=#d6d6d6
| 12782 Mauersberger ||  ||  || March 5, 1995 || Tautenburg Observatory || F. Börngen || HYG || align=right | 14 km || 
|-id=783 bgcolor=#fefefe
| 12783 || 1995 GV || — || April 7, 1995 || Ōizumi || T. Kobayashi || FLO || align=right | 3.2 km || 
|-id=784 bgcolor=#fefefe
| 12784 ||  || — || August 31, 1995 || Ōizumi || T. Kobayashi || NYS || align=right | 2.8 km || 
|-id=785 bgcolor=#fefefe
| 12785 || 1995 ST || — || September 19, 1995 || Church Stretton || S. P. Laurie || V || align=right | 2.8 km || 
|-id=786 bgcolor=#fefefe
| 12786 || 1995 SU || — || September 19, 1995 || Church Stretton || S. P. Laurie || — || align=right | 3.5 km || 
|-id=787 bgcolor=#fefefe
| 12787 Abetadashi ||  ||  || September 20, 1995 || Kitami || K. Endate, K. Watanabe || — || align=right | 3.9 km || 
|-id=788 bgcolor=#fefefe
| 12788 Shigeno ||  ||  || September 22, 1995 || Nanyo || T. Okuni || — || align=right | 5.7 km || 
|-id=789 bgcolor=#fefefe
| 12789 Salvadoraguirre || 1995 TX ||  || October 14, 1995 || Kitt Peak || C. W. Hergenrother || — || align=right | 5.4 km || 
|-id=790 bgcolor=#fefefe
| 12790 Cernan ||  ||  || October 24, 1995 || Kleť || Kleť Obs. || — || align=right | 4.9 km || 
|-id=791 bgcolor=#fefefe
| 12791 ||  || — || October 20, 1995 || Ōizumi || T. Kobayashi || V || align=right | 3.5 km || 
|-id=792 bgcolor=#fefefe
| 12792 ||  || — || October 27, 1995 || Ōizumi || T. Kobayashi || NYS || align=right | 5.6 km || 
|-id=793 bgcolor=#fefefe
| 12793 Hosinokokai ||  ||  || October 30, 1995 || Nanyo || T. Okuni || FLO || align=right | 3.4 km || 
|-id=794 bgcolor=#E9E9E9
| 12794 || 1995 VL || — || November 2, 1995 || Ōizumi || T. Kobayashi || — || align=right | 3.6 km || 
|-id=795 bgcolor=#E9E9E9
| 12795 ||  || — || November 11, 1995 || Xinglong || SCAP || — || align=right | 8.7 km || 
|-id=796 bgcolor=#fefefe
| 12796 Kamenrider || 1995 WF ||  || November 16, 1995 || Kuma Kogen || A. Nakamura || — || align=right | 5.1 km || 
|-id=797 bgcolor=#fefefe
| 12797 ||  || — || November 20, 1995 || Ōizumi || T. Kobayashi || NYS || align=right | 5.7 km || 
|-id=798 bgcolor=#fefefe
| 12798 ||  || — || November 24, 1995 || Ōizumi || T. Kobayashi || NYS || align=right | 3.1 km || 
|-id=799 bgcolor=#fefefe
| 12799 von Suttner ||  ||  || November 26, 1995 || Kleť || Kleť Obs. || — || align=right | 5.7 km || 
|-id=800 bgcolor=#fefefe
| 12800 Oobayashiarata ||  ||  || November 27, 1995 || Ōizumi || T. Kobayashi || MAS || align=right | 4.2 km || 
|}

12801–12900 

|-bgcolor=#fefefe
| 12801 Somekawa || 1995 XD ||  || December 2, 1995 || Ōizumi || T. Kobayashi || V || align=right | 2.7 km || 
|-id=802 bgcolor=#fefefe
| 12802 Hagino ||  ||  || December 15, 1995 || Ōizumi || T. Kobayashi || NYS || align=right | 2.4 km || 
|-id=803 bgcolor=#fefefe
| 12803 || 1995 YF || — || December 17, 1995 || Ōizumi || T. Kobayashi || NYS || align=right | 3.4 km || 
|-id=804 bgcolor=#E9E9E9
| 12804 ||  || — || December 27, 1995 || Ōizumi || T. Kobayashi || — || align=right | 3.9 km || 
|-id=805 bgcolor=#fefefe
| 12805 ||  || — || December 21, 1995 || Haleakalā || NEAT || — || align=right | 4.0 km || 
|-id=806 bgcolor=#fefefe
| 12806 || 1996 AN || — || January 11, 1996 || Ōizumi || T. Kobayashi || NYS || align=right | 3.6 km || 
|-id=807 bgcolor=#E9E9E9
| 12807 || 1996 AW || — || January 11, 1996 || Ōizumi || T. Kobayashi || — || align=right | 3.2 km || 
|-id=808 bgcolor=#E9E9E9
| 12808 ||  || — || January 12, 1996 || Ōizumi || T. Kobayashi || slow || align=right | 6.0 km || 
|-id=809 bgcolor=#E9E9E9
| 12809 || 1996 BB || — || January 16, 1996 || Ōizumi || T. Kobayashi || GEF || align=right | 7.8 km || 
|-id=810 bgcolor=#E9E9E9
| 12810 Okumiomote || 1996 BV ||  || January 17, 1996 || Kitami || K. Endate, K. Watanabe || — || align=right | 4.1 km || 
|-id=811 bgcolor=#fefefe
| 12811 Rigonistern ||  ||  || February 14, 1996 || Cima Ekar || U. Munari, M. Tombelli || — || align=right | 2.7 km || 
|-id=812 bgcolor=#fefefe
| 12812 Cioni ||  ||  || February 14, 1996 || Cima Ekar || M. Tombelli, U. Munari || — || align=right | 6.7 km || 
|-id=813 bgcolor=#E9E9E9
| 12813 Paolapaolini ||  ||  || February 14, 1996 || Cima Ekar || M. Tombelli, U. Munari || GEF || align=right | 5.0 km || 
|-id=814 bgcolor=#fefefe
| 12814 Vittorio ||  ||  || February 13, 1996 || Cima Ekar || M. Tombelli, U. Munari || V || align=right | 4.2 km || 
|-id=815 bgcolor=#d6d6d6
| 12815 ||  || — || February 23, 1996 || Ōizumi || T. Kobayashi || KOR || align=right | 4.7 km || 
|-id=816 bgcolor=#d6d6d6
| 12816 ||  || — || March 15, 1996 || Haleakalā || NEAT || — || align=right | 10 km || 
|-id=817 bgcolor=#d6d6d6
| 12817 Federica ||  ||  || March 22, 1996 || La Silla || E. W. Elst || — || align=right | 9.3 km || 
|-id=818 bgcolor=#E9E9E9
| 12818 Tomhanks ||  ||  || April 13, 1996 || Kitt Peak || Spacewatch || HEN || align=right | 5.4 km || 
|-id=819 bgcolor=#d6d6d6
| 12819 Susumutakahasi || 1996 JO ||  || May 12, 1996 || Moriyama || R. H. McNaught, Y. Ikari || — || align=right | 10 km || 
|-id=820 bgcolor=#d6d6d6
| 12820 Robinwilliams ||  ||  || May 11, 1996 || Kitt Peak || Spacewatch || — || align=right | 6.4 km || 
|-id=821 bgcolor=#fefefe
| 12821 ||  || — || September 10, 1996 || Xinglong || SCAP || — || align=right | 3.2 km || 
|-id=822 bgcolor=#fefefe
| 12822 ||  || — || December 2, 1996 || Ōizumi || T. Kobayashi || — || align=right | 3.2 km || 
|-id=823 bgcolor=#fefefe
| 12823 Pochintesta || 1997 AP ||  || January 2, 1997 || Ōizumi || T. Kobayashi || FLO || align=right | 2.8 km || 
|-id=824 bgcolor=#fefefe
| 12824 ||  || — || January 6, 1997 || Ōizumi || T. Kobayashi || — || align=right | 3.7 km || 
|-id=825 bgcolor=#fefefe
| 12825 ||  || — || January 9, 1997 || Ōizumi || T. Kobayashi || NYS || align=right | 1.9 km || 
|-id=826 bgcolor=#fefefe
| 12826 ||  || — || January 9, 1997 || Ōizumi || T. Kobayashi || — || align=right | 3.6 km || 
|-id=827 bgcolor=#fefefe
| 12827 ||  || — || January 5, 1997 || Xinglong || SCAP || V || align=right | 3.8 km || 
|-id=828 bgcolor=#fefefe
| 12828 Batteas ||  ||  || January 3, 1997 || Kitt Peak || Spacewatch || — || align=right | 3.0 km || 
|-id=829 bgcolor=#fefefe
| 12829 ||  || — || January 10, 1997 || Ōizumi || T. Kobayashi || — || align=right | 3.1 km || 
|-id=830 bgcolor=#fefefe
| 12830 ||  || — || January 29, 1997 || Ōizumi || T. Kobayashi || — || align=right | 2.9 km || 
|-id=831 bgcolor=#fefefe
| 12831 ||  || — || January 29, 1997 || Nachi-Katsuura || Y. Shimizu, T. Urata || — || align=right | 3.2 km || 
|-id=832 bgcolor=#fefefe
| 12832 ||  || — || February 1, 1997 || Ōizumi || T. Kobayashi || — || align=right | 6.0 km || 
|-id=833 bgcolor=#fefefe
| 12833 Kamenný Újezd ||  ||  || February 2, 1997 || Kleť || J. Tichá, M. Tichý || — || align=right | 2.6 km || 
|-id=834 bgcolor=#fefefe
| 12834 Bomben ||  ||  || February 4, 1997 || Kitt Peak || Spacewatch || — || align=right | 3.1 km || 
|-id=835 bgcolor=#fefefe
| 12835 Stropek ||  ||  || February 7, 1997 || Kleť || Kleť Obs. || V || align=right | 3.1 km || 
|-id=836 bgcolor=#fefefe
| 12836 ||  || — || February 13, 1997 || Ōizumi || T. Kobayashi || — || align=right | 3.0 km || 
|-id=837 bgcolor=#fefefe
| 12837 ||  || — || March 4, 1997 || Socorro || LINEAR || FLO || align=right | 4.6 km || 
|-id=838 bgcolor=#d6d6d6
| 12838 Adamsmith ||  ||  || March 9, 1997 || La Silla || E. W. Elst || KOR || align=right | 8.4 km || 
|-id=839 bgcolor=#E9E9E9
| 12839 ||  || — || March 29, 1997 || Xinglong || SCAP || — || align=right | 4.0 km || 
|-id=840 bgcolor=#fefefe
| 12840 Paolaferrari ||  ||  || April 6, 1997 || San Marcello || L. Tesi, G. Cattani || — || align=right | 3.8 km || 
|-id=841 bgcolor=#fefefe
| 12841 ||  || — || April 2, 1997 || Socorro || LINEAR || EUT || align=right | 3.0 km || 
|-id=842 bgcolor=#E9E9E9
| 12842 ||  || — || April 6, 1997 || Socorro || LINEAR || — || align=right | 9.2 km || 
|-id=843 bgcolor=#fefefe
| 12843 Ewers ||  ||  || April 9, 1997 || Kitt Peak || Spacewatch || — || align=right | 3.8 km || 
|-id=844 bgcolor=#d6d6d6
| 12844 ||  || — || May 9, 1997 || Kashihara || F. Uto || EOS || align=right | 11 km || 
|-id=845 bgcolor=#E9E9E9
| 12845 Crick ||  ||  || May 3, 1997 || La Silla || E. W. Elst || HEN || align=right | 3.3 km || 
|-id=846 bgcolor=#d6d6d6
| 12846 Fullerton || 1997 MR ||  || June 28, 1997 || Kitt Peak || Spacewatch || — || align=right | 7.9 km || 
|-id=847 bgcolor=#E9E9E9
| 12847 ||  || — || July 6, 1997 || Farra d'Isonzo || Farra d'Isonzo || — || align=right | 13 km || 
|-id=848 bgcolor=#E9E9E9
| 12848 Agostino ||  ||  || July 10, 1997 || Campo Imperatore || A. Boattini || — || align=right | 4.9 km || 
|-id=849 bgcolor=#d6d6d6
| 12849 ||  || — || August 27, 1997 || Nachi-Katsuura || Y. Shimizu, T. Urata || EOS || align=right | 13 km || 
|-id=850 bgcolor=#fefefe
| 12850 Axelmunthe ||  ||  || February 6, 1998 || La Silla || E. W. Elst || — || align=right | 4.5 km || 
|-id=851 bgcolor=#fefefe
| 12851 ||  || — || February 22, 1998 || Haleakalā || NEAT || — || align=right | 2.2 km || 
|-id=852 bgcolor=#fefefe
| 12852 Teply ||  ||  || March 20, 1998 || Socorro || LINEAR || — || align=right | 3.8 km || 
|-id=853 bgcolor=#E9E9E9
| 12853 ||  || — || March 31, 1998 || Socorro || LINEAR || — || align=right | 5.2 km || 
|-id=854 bgcolor=#fefefe
| 12854 ||  || — || April 29, 1998 || Haleakalā || NEAT || — || align=right | 2.9 km || 
|-id=855 bgcolor=#E9E9E9
| 12855 Tewksbury ||  ||  || April 20, 1998 || Socorro || LINEAR || — || align=right | 3.3 km || 
|-id=856 bgcolor=#fefefe
| 12856 ||  || — || April 21, 1998 || Socorro || LINEAR || — || align=right | 4.7 km || 
|-id=857 bgcolor=#d6d6d6
| 12857 ||  || — || April 21, 1998 || Socorro || LINEAR || KOR || align=right | 6.6 km || 
|-id=858 bgcolor=#fefefe
| 12858 ||  || — || May 1, 1998 || Haleakalā || NEAT || — || align=right | 3.0 km || 
|-id=859 bgcolor=#fefefe
| 12859 Marlamoore ||  ||  || May 18, 1998 || Anderson Mesa || LONEOS || NYS || align=right | 2.8 km || 
|-id=860 bgcolor=#fefefe
| 12860 Turney ||  ||  || May 22, 1998 || Socorro || LINEAR || slow? || align=right | 3.1 km || 
|-id=861 bgcolor=#E9E9E9
| 12861 Wacker ||  ||  || May 22, 1998 || Socorro || LINEAR || — || align=right | 3.3 km || 
|-id=862 bgcolor=#E9E9E9
| 12862 ||  || — || May 22, 1998 || Socorro || LINEAR || — || align=right | 2.6 km || 
|-id=863 bgcolor=#fefefe
| 12863 Whitfield ||  ||  || May 22, 1998 || Socorro || LINEAR || — || align=right | 3.4 km || 
|-id=864 bgcolor=#E9E9E9
| 12864 ||  || — || May 23, 1998 || Socorro || LINEAR || — || align=right | 7.9 km || 
|-id=865 bgcolor=#d6d6d6
| 12865 ||  || — || May 23, 1998 || Socorro || LINEAR || EOS || align=right | 8.0 km || 
|-id=866 bgcolor=#fefefe
| 12866 Yanamadala ||  ||  || May 22, 1998 || Socorro || LINEAR || NYS || align=right | 2.6 km || 
|-id=867 bgcolor=#fefefe
| 12867 Joëloïc ||  ||  || June 1, 1998 || La Silla || E. W. Elst || FLOslow || align=right | 4.2 km || 
|-id=868 bgcolor=#d6d6d6
| 12868 Onken ||  ||  || June 19, 1998 || Anderson Mesa || LONEOS || slow || align=right | 14 km || 
|-id=869 bgcolor=#d6d6d6
| 12869 ||  || — || June 24, 1998 || Socorro || LINEAR || — || align=right | 5.3 km || 
|-id=870 bgcolor=#E9E9E9
| 12870 Rolandmeier ||  ||  || June 24, 1998 || Anderson Mesa || LONEOS || RAF || align=right | 4.9 km || 
|-id=871 bgcolor=#fefefe
| 12871 Samarasinha ||  ||  || June 24, 1998 || Anderson Mesa || LONEOS || FLO || align=right | 3.6 km || 
|-id=872 bgcolor=#fefefe
| 12872 Susiestevens ||  ||  || July 21, 1998 || Socorro || LINEAR || FLO || align=right | 3.0 km || 
|-id=873 bgcolor=#fefefe
| 12873 Clausewitz ||  ||  || July 26, 1998 || La Silla || E. W. Elst || V || align=right | 2.9 km || 
|-id=874 bgcolor=#d6d6d6
| 12874 Poisson || 1998 QZ ||  || August 19, 1998 || Prescott || P. G. Comba || — || align=right | 5.4 km || 
|-id=875 bgcolor=#E9E9E9
| 12875 ||  || — || August 19, 1998 || Haleakalā || NEAT || — || align=right | 6.0 km || 
|-id=876 bgcolor=#d6d6d6
| 12876 ||  || — || August 17, 1998 || Socorro || LINEAR || KOR || align=right | 5.7 km || 
|-id=877 bgcolor=#fefefe
| 12877 ||  || — || August 17, 1998 || Socorro || LINEAR || — || align=right | 7.9 km || 
|-id=878 bgcolor=#E9E9E9
| 12878 Erneschiller ||  ||  || August 17, 1998 || Socorro || LINEAR || — || align=right | 4.3 km || 
|-id=879 bgcolor=#d6d6d6
| 12879 ||  || — || August 17, 1998 || Socorro || LINEAR || EOS || align=right | 7.2 km || 
|-id=880 bgcolor=#E9E9E9
| 12880 Juliegrady ||  ||  || August 17, 1998 || Socorro || LINEAR || — || align=right | 3.3 km || 
|-id=881 bgcolor=#E9E9E9
| 12881 Yepeiyu ||  ||  || August 17, 1998 || Socorro || LINEAR || — || align=right | 5.9 km || 
|-id=882 bgcolor=#d6d6d6
| 12882 ||  || — || August 17, 1998 || Socorro || LINEAR || — || align=right | 18 km || 
|-id=883 bgcolor=#fefefe
| 12883 ||  || — || August 17, 1998 || Socorro || LINEAR || FLO || align=right | 3.9 km || 
|-id=884 bgcolor=#d6d6d6
| 12884 ||  || — || August 17, 1998 || Socorro || LINEAR || THM || align=right | 13 km || 
|-id=885 bgcolor=#E9E9E9
| 12885 ||  || — || August 17, 1998 || Socorro || LINEAR || — || align=right | 8.0 km || 
|-id=886 bgcolor=#E9E9E9
| 12886 ||  || — || August 17, 1998 || Socorro || LINEAR || GEF || align=right | 6.9 km || 
|-id=887 bgcolor=#d6d6d6
| 12887 ||  || — || August 17, 1998 || Socorro || LINEAR || THM || align=right | 10 km || 
|-id=888 bgcolor=#d6d6d6
| 12888 ||  || — || August 17, 1998 || Socorro || LINEAR || — || align=right | 17 km || 
|-id=889 bgcolor=#d6d6d6
| 12889 ||  || — || August 17, 1998 || Socorro || LINEAR || THM || align=right | 12 km || 
|-id=890 bgcolor=#d6d6d6
| 12890 ||  || — || August 17, 1998 || Socorro || LINEAR || — || align=right | 14 km || 
|-id=891 bgcolor=#E9E9E9
| 12891 ||  || — || August 17, 1998 || Socorro || LINEAR || AGN || align=right | 5.2 km || 
|-id=892 bgcolor=#E9E9E9
| 12892 ||  || — || August 17, 1998 || Socorro || LINEAR || — || align=right | 5.9 km || 
|-id=893 bgcolor=#d6d6d6
| 12893 Mommert ||  ||  || August 26, 1998 || Caussols || ODAS || — || align=right | 5.2 km || 
|-id=894 bgcolor=#E9E9E9
| 12894 ||  || — || August 24, 1998 || Socorro || LINEAR || ADE || align=right | 12 km || 
|-id=895 bgcolor=#fefefe
| 12895 Balbastre ||  ||  || August 26, 1998 || La Silla || E. W. Elst || FLO || align=right | 2.6 km || 
|-id=896 bgcolor=#d6d6d6
| 12896 Geoffroy ||  ||  || August 26, 1998 || La Silla || E. W. Elst || 3:2 || align=right | 14 km || 
|-id=897 bgcolor=#fefefe
| 12897 Bougeret ||  ||  || September 13, 1998 || Anderson Mesa || LONEOS || — || align=right | 3.4 km || 
|-id=898 bgcolor=#d6d6d6
| 12898 Mignard ||  ||  || September 14, 1998 || Anderson Mesa || LONEOS || — || align=right | 9.5 km || 
|-id=899 bgcolor=#fefefe
| 12899 ||  || — || September 1, 1998 || Woomera || F. B. Zoltowski || NYS || align=right | 3.3 km || 
|-id=900 bgcolor=#d6d6d6
| 12900 Rishabjain ||  ||  || September 14, 1998 || Socorro || LINEAR || — || align=right | 8.2 km || 
|}

12901–13000 

|-bgcolor=#d6d6d6
| 12901 ||  || — || September 14, 1998 || Socorro || LINEAR || — || align=right | 7.1 km || 
|-id=902 bgcolor=#d6d6d6
| 12902 ||  || — || September 14, 1998 || Socorro || LINEAR || — || align=right | 10 km || 
|-id=903 bgcolor=#fefefe
| 12903 ||  || — || September 14, 1998 || Socorro || LINEAR || NYS || align=right | 3.8 km || 
|-id=904 bgcolor=#d6d6d6
| 12904 ||  || — || September 14, 1998 || Socorro || LINEAR || THM || align=right | 11 km || 
|-id=905 bgcolor=#d6d6d6
| 12905 ||  || — || September 14, 1998 || Socorro || LINEAR || THM || align=right | 11 km || 
|-id=906 bgcolor=#E9E9E9
| 12906 ||  || — || September 14, 1998 || Socorro || LINEAR || AGN || align=right | 4.9 km || 
|-id=907 bgcolor=#E9E9E9
| 12907 ||  || — || September 14, 1998 || Socorro || LINEAR || — || align=right | 9.7 km || 
|-id=908 bgcolor=#E9E9E9
| 12908 Yagudina ||  ||  || September 22, 1998 || Anderson Mesa || LONEOS || EUN || align=right | 7.2 km || 
|-id=909 bgcolor=#E9E9E9
| 12909 Jaclifford ||  ||  || September 17, 1998 || Anderson Mesa || LONEOS || — || align=right | 3.6 km || 
|-id=910 bgcolor=#E9E9E9
| 12910 Deliso ||  ||  || September 17, 1998 || Anderson Mesa || LONEOS || — || align=right | 3.2 km || 
|-id=911 bgcolor=#d6d6d6
| 12911 Goodhue ||  ||  || September 17, 1998 || Anderson Mesa || LONEOS || THM || align=right | 15 km || 
|-id=912 bgcolor=#d6d6d6
| 12912 Streator ||  ||  || September 17, 1998 || Anderson Mesa || LONEOS || THM || align=right | 11 km || 
|-id=913 bgcolor=#E9E9E9
| 12913 ||  || — || September 26, 1998 || Socorro || LINEAR || WIT || align=right | 5.7 km || 
|-id=914 bgcolor=#E9E9E9
| 12914 ||  || — || September 26, 1998 || Socorro || LINEAR || EUN || align=right | 9.5 km || 
|-id=915 bgcolor=#E9E9E9
| 12915 ||  || — || September 26, 1998 || Socorro || LINEAR || — || align=right | 5.6 km || 
|-id=916 bgcolor=#C2FFFF
| 12916 Eteoneus ||  ||  || October 13, 1998 || Caussols || ODAS || L4 || align=right | 22 km || 
|-id=917 bgcolor=#C2FFFF
| 12917 ||  || — || October 13, 1998 || Višnjan Observatory || K. Korlević || L4 || align=right | 25 km || 
|-id=918 bgcolor=#d6d6d6
| 12918 ||  || — || October 29, 1998 || Višnjan Observatory || K. Korlević || EOS || align=right | 14 km || 
|-id=919 bgcolor=#fefefe
| 12919 Tomjohnson ||  ||  || November 11, 1998 || Catalina || CSS || — || align=right | 4.9 km || 
|-id=920 bgcolor=#d6d6d6
| 12920 ||  || — || November 10, 1998 || Socorro || LINEAR || 3:2 || align=right | 35 km || 
|-id=921 bgcolor=#C2FFFF
| 12921 ||  || — || November 20, 1998 || Nachi-Katsuura || Y. Shimizu, T. Urata || L4 || align=right | 32 km || 
|-id=922 bgcolor=#d6d6d6
| 12922 ||  || — || November 27, 1998 || Woomera || F. B. Zoltowski || — || align=right | 16 km || 
|-id=923 bgcolor=#FFC2E0
| 12923 Zephyr ||  ||  || April 11, 1999 || Anderson Mesa || LONEOS || APO +1kmPHA || align=right | 2.1 km || 
|-id=924 bgcolor=#fefefe
| 12924 ||  || — || September 7, 1999 || Socorro || LINEAR || — || align=right | 2.3 km || 
|-id=925 bgcolor=#fefefe
| 12925 ||  || — || September 29, 1999 || Višnjan Observatory || Višnjan Obs. || — || align=right | 3.9 km || 
|-id=926 bgcolor=#E9E9E9
| 12926 Brianmason ||  ||  || September 27, 1999 || Takapuna || J. L. Schiff, C. J. Schiff || — || align=right | 10 km || 
|-id=927 bgcolor=#fefefe
| 12927 Pinocchio ||  ||  || September 30, 1999 || San Marcello || M. Tombelli, L. Tesi || FLO || align=right | 1.7 km || 
|-id=928 bgcolor=#E9E9E9
| 12928 Nicolapozio ||  ||  || September 30, 1999 || San Marcello || A. Boattini, G. Forti || — || align=right | 5.4 km || 
|-id=929 bgcolor=#C2FFFF
| 12929 Periboea ||  ||  || October 2, 1999 || Fountain Hills || C. W. Juels || L5 || align=right | 54 km || 
|-id=930 bgcolor=#d6d6d6
| 12930 ||  || — || October 2, 1999 || Višnjan Observatory || K. Korlević, M. Jurić || THM || align=right | 9.4 km || 
|-id=931 bgcolor=#E9E9E9
| 12931 Mario ||  ||  || October 7, 1999 || Gnosca || S. Sposetti || — || align=right | 4.6 km || 
|-id=932 bgcolor=#fefefe
| 12932 Conedera ||  ||  || October 10, 1999 || Gnosca || S. Sposetti || NYS || align=right | 3.0 km || 
|-id=933 bgcolor=#fefefe
| 12933 Muzzonigro ||  ||  || October 14, 1999 || Farra d'Isonzo || Farra d'Isonzo || — || align=right | 2.3 km || 
|-id=934 bgcolor=#fefefe
| 12934 Bisque ||  ||  || October 11, 1999 || Fountain Hills || C. W. Juels || — || align=right | 4.4 km || 
|-id=935 bgcolor=#fefefe
| 12935 Zhengzhemin ||  ||  || October 2, 1999 || Xinglong || SCAP || — || align=right | 5.6 km || 
|-id=936 bgcolor=#d6d6d6
| 12936 || 2549 P-L || — || September 24, 1960 || Palomar || PLS || KOR || align=right | 5.1 km || 
|-id=937 bgcolor=#E9E9E9
| 12937 Premadi || 3024 P-L ||  || September 24, 1960 || Palomar || PLS || MIT || align=right | 11 km || 
|-id=938 bgcolor=#E9E9E9
| 12938 || 4161 P-L || — || September 24, 1960 || Palomar || PLS || RAF || align=right | 5.8 km || 
|-id=939 bgcolor=#fefefe
| 12939 || 4206 P-L || — || September 24, 1960 || Palomar || PLS || — || align=right | 3.7 km || 
|-id=940 bgcolor=#fefefe
| 12940 || 4588 P-L || — || September 24, 1960 || Palomar || PLS || — || align=right | 2.7 km || 
|-id=941 bgcolor=#E9E9E9
| 12941 || 4638 P-L || — || September 24, 1960 || Palomar || PLS || — || align=right | 3.6 km || 
|-id=942 bgcolor=#d6d6d6
| 12942 || 6054 P-L || — || September 24, 1960 || Palomar || PLS || — || align=right | 7.3 km || 
|-id=943 bgcolor=#E9E9E9
| 12943 || 6670 P-L || — || September 24, 1960 || Palomar || PLS || — || align=right | 7.7 km || 
|-id=944 bgcolor=#d6d6d6
| 12944 || 6745 P-L || — || September 24, 1960 || Palomar || PLS || THM || align=right | 6.8 km || 
|-id=945 bgcolor=#fefefe
| 12945 || 9534 P-L || — || October 17, 1960 || Palomar || PLS || NYS || align=right | 7.1 km || 
|-id=946 bgcolor=#fefefe
| 12946 || 1290 T-1 || — || March 25, 1971 || Palomar || PLS || V || align=right | 2.4 km || 
|-id=947 bgcolor=#fefefe
| 12947 || 3099 T-1 || — || March 26, 1971 || Palomar || PLS || FLO || align=right | 3.5 km || 
|-id=948 bgcolor=#d6d6d6
| 12948 || 4273 T-1 || — || March 26, 1971 || Palomar || PLS || — || align=right | 5.4 km || 
|-id=949 bgcolor=#d6d6d6
| 12949 || 4290 T-1 || — || March 26, 1971 || Palomar || PLS || 7:4 || align=right | 18 km || 
|-id=950 bgcolor=#E9E9E9
| 12950 || 4321 T-1 || — || March 26, 1971 || Palomar || PLS || — || align=right | 7.3 km || 
|-id=951 bgcolor=#d6d6d6
| 12951 || 1041 T-2 || — || September 29, 1973 || Palomar || PLS || KOR || align=right | 5.8 km || 
|-id=952 bgcolor=#d6d6d6
| 12952 || 1102 T-2 || — || September 29, 1973 || Palomar || PLS || KOR || align=right | 3.9 km || 
|-id=953 bgcolor=#E9E9E9
| 12953 || 1264 T-2 || — || September 29, 1973 || Palomar || PLS || — || align=right | 3.3 km || 
|-id=954 bgcolor=#d6d6d6
| 12954 || 2040 T-2 || — || September 29, 1973 || Palomar || PLS || — || align=right | 4.4 km || 
|-id=955 bgcolor=#E9E9E9
| 12955 || 2162 T-2 || — || September 29, 1973 || Palomar || PLS || — || align=right | 2.3 km || 
|-id=956 bgcolor=#fefefe
| 12956 || 2232 T-2 || — || September 29, 1973 || Palomar || PLS || — || align=right | 3.0 km || 
|-id=957 bgcolor=#E9E9E9
| 12957 || 2258 T-2 || — || September 29, 1973 || Palomar || PLS || — || align=right | 4.0 km || 
|-id=958 bgcolor=#E9E9E9
| 12958 || 2276 T-2 || — || September 29, 1973 || Palomar || PLS || — || align=right | 2.5 km || 
|-id=959 bgcolor=#E9E9E9
| 12959 || 3086 T-2 || — || September 30, 1973 || Palomar || PLS || — || align=right | 3.6 km || 
|-id=960 bgcolor=#E9E9E9
| 12960 || 4165 T-2 || — || September 29, 1973 || Palomar || PLS || — || align=right | 4.7 km || 
|-id=961 bgcolor=#fefefe
| 12961 || 4262 T-2 || — || September 29, 1973 || Palomar || PLS || — || align=right | 2.0 km || 
|-id=962 bgcolor=#d6d6d6
| 12962 || 4297 T-2 || — || September 29, 1973 || Palomar || PLS || 7:4 || align=right | 9.3 km || 
|-id=963 bgcolor=#fefefe
| 12963 || 5485 T-2 || — || September 30, 1973 || Palomar || PLS || V || align=right | 3.9 km || 
|-id=964 bgcolor=#fefefe
| 12964 || 1071 T-3 || — || October 17, 1977 || Palomar || PLS || V || align=right | 3.4 km || 
|-id=965 bgcolor=#E9E9E9
| 12965 || 1080 T-3 || — || October 17, 1977 || Palomar || PLS || — || align=right | 5.8 km || 
|-id=966 bgcolor=#d6d6d6
| 12966 || 1102 T-3 || — || October 17, 1977 || Palomar || PLS || — || align=right | 11 km || 
|-id=967 bgcolor=#fefefe
| 12967 || 3105 T-3 || — || October 16, 1977 || Palomar || PLS || NYS || align=right | 6.1 km || 
|-id=968 bgcolor=#d6d6d6
| 12968 || 3261 T-3 || — || October 16, 1977 || Palomar || PLS || — || align=right | 8.3 km || 
|-id=969 bgcolor=#d6d6d6
| 12969 || 3482 T-3 || — || October 16, 1977 || Palomar || PLS || THM || align=right | 5.0 km || 
|-id=970 bgcolor=#d6d6d6
| 12970 || 4012 T-3 || — || October 16, 1977 || Palomar || PLS || EOS || align=right | 7.6 km || 
|-id=971 bgcolor=#d6d6d6
| 12971 || 4054 T-3 || — || October 16, 1977 || Palomar || PLS || — || align=right | 12 km || 
|-id=972 bgcolor=#C2FFFF
| 12972 Eumaios ||  ||  || September 19, 1973 || Palomar || PLS || L4 || align=right | 23 km || 
|-id=973 bgcolor=#C2FFFF
| 12973 Melanthios ||  ||  || September 19, 1973 || Palomar || PLS || L4 || align=right | 28 km || 
|-id=974 bgcolor=#C2FFFF
| 12974 Halitherses ||  ||  || September 19, 1973 || Palomar || PLS || L4 || align=right | 25 km || 
|-id=975 bgcolor=#E9E9E9
| 12975 Efremov ||  ||  || September 28, 1973 || Nauchnij || N. S. Chernykh || MAR || align=right | 6.7 km || 
|-id=976 bgcolor=#fefefe
| 12976 Kalinenkov ||  ||  || August 26, 1976 || Nauchnij || N. S. Chernykh || — || align=right | 4.1 km || 
|-id=977 bgcolor=#E9E9E9
| 12977 || 1978 NC || — || July 10, 1978 || Palomar || E. F. Helin, E. M. Shoemaker || — || align=right | 6.0 km || 
|-id=978 bgcolor=#fefefe
| 12978 Ivashov ||  ||  || September 26, 1978 || Nauchnij || L. V. Zhuravleva || FLO || align=right | 3.1 km || 
|-id=979 bgcolor=#fefefe
| 12979 Evgalvasilʹev ||  ||  || September 26, 1978 || Nauchnij || L. V. Zhuravleva || FLO || align=right | 2.9 km || 
|-id=980 bgcolor=#fefefe
| 12980 Pruetz ||  ||  || November 6, 1978 || Palomar || E. F. Helin, S. J. Bus || NYS || align=right | 1.9 km || 
|-id=981 bgcolor=#d6d6d6
| 12981 Tracicase ||  ||  || November 7, 1978 || Palomar || E. F. Helin, S. J. Bus || — || align=right | 8.1 km || 
|-id=982 bgcolor=#fefefe
| 12982 Kaseybond ||  ||  || June 25, 1979 || Siding Spring || E. F. Helin, S. J. Bus || Vslow || align=right | 2.1 km || 
|-id=983 bgcolor=#d6d6d6
| 12983 Mattcox ||  ||  || July 24, 1979 || Palomar || S. J. Bus || — || align=right | 16 km || 
|-id=984 bgcolor=#d6d6d6
| 12984 Lowry ||  ||  || August 22, 1979 || La Silla || C.-I. Lagerkvist || KOR || align=right | 4.8 km || 
|-id=985 bgcolor=#fefefe
| 12985 Mattgarrison ||  ||  || October 31, 1980 || Palomar || S. J. Bus || NYS || align=right | 2.6 km || 
|-id=986 bgcolor=#d6d6d6
| 12986 Kretke ||  ||  || February 28, 1981 || Siding Spring || S. J. Bus || TRE || align=right | 7.8 km || 
|-id=987 bgcolor=#fefefe
| 12987 Racalmuto ||  ||  || March 5, 1981 || La Silla || H. Debehogne, G. DeSanctis || — || align=right | 5.4 km || 
|-id=988 bgcolor=#fefefe
| 12988 Tiffanykapler ||  ||  || March 2, 1981 || Siding Spring || S. J. Bus || — || align=right | 2.0 km || 
|-id=989 bgcolor=#fefefe
| 12989 Chriseanderson ||  ||  || March 1, 1981 || Siding Spring || S. J. Bus || FLO || align=right | 1.5 km || 
|-id=990 bgcolor=#fefefe
| 12990 Josetillard ||  ||  || March 6, 1981 || Siding Spring || S. J. Bus || — || align=right | 3.9 km || 
|-id=991 bgcolor=#d6d6d6
| 12991 Davidgriffiths ||  ||  || March 2, 1981 || Siding Spring || S. J. Bus || KOR || align=right | 3.7 km || 
|-id=992 bgcolor=#fefefe
| 12992 ||  || — || March 2, 1981 || Siding Spring || S. J. Bus || — || align=right | 2.4 km || 
|-id=993 bgcolor=#d6d6d6
| 12993 ||  || — || March 2, 1981 || Siding Spring || S. J. Bus || — || align=right | 6.1 km || 
|-id=994 bgcolor=#d6d6d6
| 12994 ||  || — || March 2, 1981 || Siding Spring || S. J. Bus || KOR || align=right | 4.3 km || 
|-id=995 bgcolor=#E9E9E9
| 12995 ||  || — || March 2, 1981 || Siding Spring || S. J. Bus || — || align=right | 4.7 km || 
|-id=996 bgcolor=#d6d6d6
| 12996 ||  || — || March 1, 1981 || Siding Spring || S. J. Bus || EOS || align=right | 5.6 km || 
|-id=997 bgcolor=#E9E9E9
| 12997 ||  || — || March 2, 1981 || Siding Spring || S. J. Bus || EUN || align=right | 2.3 km || 
|-id=998 bgcolor=#E9E9E9
| 12998 ||  || — || March 2, 1981 || Siding Spring || S. J. Bus || — || align=right | 2.3 km || 
|-id=999 bgcolor=#fefefe
| 12999 Toruń ||  ||  || August 30, 1981 || Anderson Mesa || E. Bowell || FLO || align=right | 3.5 km || 
|-id=000 bgcolor=#E9E9E9
| 13000 ||  || — || August 25, 1981 || La Silla || H. Debehogne || — || align=right | 9.8 km || 
|}

References

External links 
 Discovery Circumstances: Numbered Minor Planets (10001)–(15000) (IAU Minor Planet Center)

0012